This is a list of African Americans, also known as Black Americans or Afro-Americans. African Americans are an ethnic group consisting of citizens of the United States who have full or partial ancestry of any black racial groups of Africa. African Americans form the third largest racial and ethnic group in the United States, behind White Americans and Hispanic and Latino Americans. African Americans are mostly descendants of enslaved black people from the United States.

To be included in this list, the person must have a Wikipedia article and references showing the person is African-American.

Actors, actresses, and comedians

A
Quinton Aaron, actor
Ira Aldridge, actor
Flex Alexander, actor
Khandi Alexander, actress 
Ajiona Alexus, actress 
Mahershala Ali, actor 
Debbie Allen, actress 
John Amos, actor
Anthony Anderson, actor 
Eddie Anderson, actor
Maya Angelou, actress
Tichina Arnold, actress 
Essence Atkins, actress
Sharif Atkins, actor 
Patti Austin, singer
James Avery, actor
Margaret Avery, actress 
Rochelle Aytes, actress

B
Anita Baker, singer
Jaylen Barron, actress (half Afro-American, half Mexican)
Michael Boatman, actor and sitcom comedian
Beyoncé, actress and singer
Leslie David Baker, actor
Tyra Banks, actress, model
Spencer Bell, actor 
Cleveland Berto, actor
B.G., rapper 
Peabo Bryson, singer
Louise Beavers, actress 
Birdman, rapper
Everett Brown, actor 
Jim Brown, actor
Malcolm Barrett, actor
Philip Bailey, singer
Toni Braxton, singer
James Baskett, actor 
Roscoe Lee Browne, actor
Avery Brooks, actor 
LeVar Burton, actor 
Tony Burton, actor
Fantasia Barrino, actress and singer
Angela Bassett, actress 
Troian Bellisario (mother is part African-American descent), actress
Steelo Brim actor, comedian
Lloyd Banks, actor
George Benson, singer
Michael Beach, actor 
Richard Brooks, actor 
Jennifer Beals (African-American father), actress 
Darryl M. Bell, actor
Paul Benjamin, actor
Wayne Brady, actor, comedian
Todd Bridges, actor 
Fred Berry, actor
Halle Berry, actress
Lisa Bonet (African-American father), actress 
Stephen Bishop, actor 
Billy Blanks, actor
Golden Brooks, actress 
Busta Rhymes, actor 
De'Aundre Bonds, actor 
Joy Bryant, actress 
Chadwick Boseman, actor 
Sterling K. Brown, actor 
Mehcad Brooks, actor 
Neil Brown Jr., actor 
Logan Browning, actress 
Trai Byers, actor 
Danielle Brooks, actress 
Cocoa Brown, actress
Rob Brown, actor 
Zazie Beetz (African-American mother), actress
Rhyon Nicole Brown, actress 
Jurnee Smollett-Bell (African-American mother), actress
Big Daddy Kane, rapper
Yvette Nicole Brown, actress
Big Gipp, rapper
Roger Aaron Brown, actor
Hannibal Buress, actor and comedian
BabyFace, singer
Sharon Bryant, R&B singer
Bone Crusher, Hip Hop rapper
 Bryshere Y. Gray, Hip Hop rapper, actor

C
Judy Cheeks, singer
Nick Cannon, actor 
CL Smooth, actor 
Nell Carter, actress 
Amanda and Samuel Chambers, early members of the Church of Jesus Christ of Latter-day Saints in Utah 
Bill Cobbs, actor
Bill Cosby, actor
Common, actor 
Deon Cole, actor 
Natalie Cole, actress
Nat King Cole, actor
Olivia Cole, actress
Chad L. Coleman, actor 
Gary Coleman, actor, comedian
Monique Coleman, actress
Mike Colter, actor 
Sean Combs, actor
Alvin Childress, actor
L. Scott Caldwell, actress
Cab Calloway, actor 
Vanessa Bell Calloway, actress
Charlie Brown, rapper and actor
Scatman Crothers, actor 
Cut Monitor Milo, actor 
Rupert Crosse, actor
Mariah Carey, (African-American father) actress
Diahann Carroll, actress 
Rocky Carroll, actor
Bernie Casey, actor
Rosalind Cash, actress and singer
Reg E. Cathey, actor
Ray Charles, actor
Dave Chappelle, actor and comedian
Don Cheadle, actor
Bill Cosby, actor and comedian
Laverne Cox, transgender actress
Tony Cox, actor 
Rusty Cundieff, actor 
Mark Curry, actor 
Lavell Crawford, actor and comedian
Chi-Ali, rapper 
Kim Coles, actress 
Ice Cube, actor 
Morris Chestnut, actor
Chingy, rapper
Frances Callier, actress
 Wyatt Cenac, (African-American Father)
Zendaya Coleman (African-American father), actress and singer

D
Deezer D, actor, rapper
Dr. Dre, actor
Jude Demorest, actress 
Dres, rapper 
DJ Yella, disc jockey and rapper 
Ava DuVernay, film director
Danny Boy, rapper
Darryl McDaniels, actor
DJ Kay Gee, rapper
Teala Dunn, actress 
Yaya DaCosta, actress 
Dinco D, actor 
Daveed Diggs (African-American father), actor 
Da'Vinchi, actor and rapper
 Colman Domingo (African-american mother), actor
Charles Michael Davis (half African-American), actor 
Taye Diggs, actor 
Hugh Dane, actor
DJ Alamo, disc jockey and rapper
Tommy Davidson, actor 
Keith David, actor, comedian
Stacey Dash (African-American father), actress 
Doug E. Fresh (Brazilian-African-American sister), beatboxer and rapper 
Viola Davis, actress 
D-Nice, actor 
LaVan Davis, actor 
Cassi Davis, actor
DMX, actor, rapper  
Gary Dourdan, actor
Michael Dorn, actor 
Tommy Davidson, actor, comedian
Omar Dorsey, actor
Nate Dogg, actor
Snoop Dogg, actor
Michael Clarke Duncan, actor 
Suzzanne Douglas, actress 
Denise Dowse, actress and director
Ja'Net DuBois, actress 
Charles S. Dutton, actor
Loretta Devine, actress 
Ivan Dixon, actor, director, producer
Ruby Dee, actress
Ossie Davis, actor
Sammy Davis Jr., actor

E
Michael Ealy, actor 
Nelsan Ellis, actor
Cedric the Entertainer, actor and comedian
Mike Epps, comedian and actor 
Omar Epps, actor
E-40, actor
Art Evans, actor
Eric B., actor
Damon Evans, actor
Mike Evans, actor

F
David Fagen, buffalo soldier, anti-imperialist 
Dave Fennoy, actor 
Jessie Lawrence Ferguson, actor
Jordan Fisher, actor
Edwina Findley, actress
Laurence Fishburne, actor
Freddie Foxxx, actor
Thomas Mikal Ford, actor, comedian
Fat Joe, actor
Ken Foree, actor
Jamie Foxx, actor 
Jaimee Foxworth, actress
Redd Foxx, comedian, actor
Roberta Flack, singer
Al Freeman Jr., actor, director
Morgan Freeman, actor
Jennifer Freeman (African-American mother), actress
Aretha Franklin, actress
Sheila Frazier, actress
Kim Fields, actress 
Vivica A. Fox, actress 
Mario Hernandez Sanchez, actor

G
Larry Graham, singer
Johnny Gill, singer
Roy Glenn, actor 
Robert Guillaume, actor
Ron Glass, actor
Grandmaster Flash, rapper and disc jockey
Marla Gibbs, actress
Tyrese Gibson, actor 
Seth Gilliam, actor
Lawrence Gilliard Jr., actor
Clarence Gilyard, actor
Robin Givens, actress
Danny Glover, actor 
Donald Glover, actor
Cuba Gooding Jr., actor
Cuba Gooding Sr., actor
Omar Gooding, actor
Whoopi Goldberg, actress
Grand Puba, rapper
Carl Gordon, actor
GZA, rapper
Louis Gossett Jr., actor 
Ghostface Killah, rapper 
Robert Gossett, actor
Kat Graham, actress
Sonequa Martin-Green, actress 
David Alan Grier, actor 
Pam Grier, actress
Rosey Grier, actor
Teresa Graves, actress
Dick Gregory, comedian, actor
Eddie Griffin, actor
Lance Gross (African-American mother), actor
Bill Gunn, actor, director
Moses Gunn, actor
Jasmine Guy, actress

H
D'atra Hicks, actress, singer
Taral Hicks, actress, singer
Karim Hill, actor and tap dancer
Steve Harvey, comedian, actor
Hill Harper, actor
Corey Hawkins, actor
D.L. Hughley, comedian, actor
Dorian Harewood, actor
Kadeem Hardison, actor, director
Jackee Harry (African-American father), actress
Brian Tyree Henry, actor 
Telma Hopkins, actress and singer 
Tiffany Haddish (African-American mother), actress
Cory Hardrict, actor 
Kene Holliday, actor
André Holland, actor
Kevin Hart, actor
Arsenio Hall, actor
Pooch Hall, actor
Regina Hall, actress 
Vondie Curtis-Hall, actor
Sherman Hemsley, actor
Darrin Henson, actor 
Taraji P. Henson, actress
Russell Hornsby, actor 
Omari Hardwick, actor
Terrance Howard, actor
Dennis Haysbert, actor 
Isaac Hayes, actor
Lloyd Haynes, actor
William Jackson Harper, actor and comedian
Robert Hooks, actor
Gregory Hines, actor
Marques Houston, actor 
Whitney Houston, actress
Paige Hurd (African-American father), actress 
Ernie Hudson, actor 
Jennifer Hudson, actress
Dennis Haysbert, actor

I
Rex Ingram, actor
Inspectah Deck, rapper
Ida B. Wells, author

J
Brandon T. Jackson, actor
Janet Jackson, actress and singer
Jermaine Jackson, actor
La Toya Jackson, actress
Michael Jackson, King of pop and actor 
Paris Jackson, actress 
Samuel L. Jackson, actor
Michael B. Jordan, actor
Skai Jackson, actress
Trevor Jackson, actor
Jackson family, entertainment
Lawrence Hilton-Jacobs, actor
Ralph Johnson, singer
Raymond St. Jacques, actor
Jazze Pha, rapper and Hip Hop producer
Bryton James, actor
Jay-Z, rapper
Roy Jones Jr., actor
Duane Jones, actor
Rashida Jones, actress
Tamala Jones, actress 
Ja Rule, rapper 
April Parker Jones, actress
Anne-Marie Johnson, actress 
Dwayne Johnson, actor
Rafer Johnson, actor
Orlando Jones, actor 
James Earl Jones, actor
Nadji Jeter, actor
Barry Jenkins, director, producer, screenwriter
Larry "Flash" Jenkins, actor, director, producer, screenwriter
Terrence Jenkins, actor 
Anne-Marie Johnson (African-American father), actress
Kristoff St. John, actor
LL Cool J, actor
J-Bo, Crunk rapper

K
Chaka Khan, singer
R. Kelly, former singer and actor
Jim Kelly, actor
Khujo, rapper
Malcolm David Kelley, actor 
Killer Mike, rapper 
Keegan-Michael Key, actor, comedian 
Wiz Khalifa, actor
Christel Khalil (African-American mother), actress
Kool G Rap, rapper
Aja Naomi King, actress
Regina King, actress
Kap G, actor
Eartha Kitt, actress
KRS-One, actor
Gladys Knight, actress
Jak Knight, actor, comedian and writer
The Kidd Creole, rapper
Boris Kodjoe, Austrian-American actor of German and Ghanaian descent
Lenny Kravitz, actor 
Zoe Kravitz, actress

L
Patti LaBelle, actress
Phil LaMarr, actor, comedian
Ted Lange, actor 
Tina Lifford, actress
Sanaa Lathan, actress 
Jacob Latimore, actor 
Martin Lawrence, actor, comedian
Scott Lawrence, actor
Bianca Lawson, actress
Lauren London (African-American mother), actress
Sharon Leal (African-American father), actress
Spike Lee, film director, producer, writer, actor
John Legend, actor, producer
Harry Lennix (African-American mother), actor 
Dawnn Lewis, actress
Phill Lewis, actor, comedian
Jenifer Lewis, actress
Tommy Lister Jr., actor
Darlene Love, actress
Loni Love, comedienne
Lord Jamar, actor
Ludacris, actor
Lil Jon, rapper
Ed Lover, rapper and actor

M
Anthony Mackie, actor
Method Man, actor
David Mann, actor
Tamela Mann, actress
Mannie Fresh, Hip Hop producer
John Marriott, actor
Don Marshall, actor
William Marshall, actor, director
Jesse L. Martin, actor
Marsai Martin, actress
Tisha Campbell-Martin, actress
Vincent Mason, disc jockey and actor
Christopher Massey, actor
Kyle Massey, actor
Masta Killa, rapper
Yahya Abdul-Mateen II, actor
Al Matthews, actor
Chi McBride, actor
Darius McCrary, actor and singer
Shane Paul McGhie, (African-Americans mother), actor
Brian McKnight, singer
Tim Meadows, actor 
Meghan, Duchess of Sussex (African-American mother), actress and humanitarian, wife of Prince Harry, Duke of Sussex
Melle Mel, actor and rapper
Kelvin Mercer, rapper and actor
Method Man, actor
Draya Michele (African-American father), actress
Windell Middlebrooks, actor
Mike Gee, rapper
Omar Benson Miller, actor
Wentworth Miller, actor
Daryl Mitchell, actor
Jason Mitchell, actor
Monica, actress
Victoria Monét(African-American mother), R&B singer
Paul Mooney, comedian and actor
Juanita Moore, actress
Shemar Moore, actor
Debbi Morgan, actress
Tracy Morgan, actor 
Garrett Morris, comedian, actor
Greg Morris, actor
Lamorne Morris, actor
Joe Morton, actor
Phil Moore, actor and TV host
Charlie Murphy, actor and comedian
Eddie Murphy, actor and comedian
Ali Shaheed Muhammad, actor
Lou Myers, actor

N
Niecy Nash, actress 
Tariq Nasheed, film producer
Naturi Naughton, actress 
Nichelle Nichols, actress
Nelly, rapper
Maidie Norman, actress
Normani, singer
Brandy Norwood, actress
Bill Nunn, actor

O
 Jeffrey Osborne, singer 
 Patrice O'Neal, actor and comedian
 Shaquille O'Neal, actor

P

LaWanda Page, actress 
Keke Palmer, actress
John Paris, singer
Kyla Pratt, actress 
Allen Payne, actor 
Jo Marie Payton, actress
Pete Rock, disc jockey and Hip Hop producer 
Tyler Perry, actor, comedian, filmmaker
Melvin Van Peebles, actor, filmmaker
Holly Robinson Peete, actress
Brock Peters, actor
Jo Marie Payton, actress 
Khary Payton, actor
Angel Parker, actress
Nicole Ari Parker, actress
Teyonah Parris, actress 
Paula Patton (African-American father), actress
Jordan Peele, actor, comedian
Nathan Pelle, actor
Paul Pena, singer-songwriter, guitarist
Madison Pettis (African-American father), actress, model
Wendell Pierce, actor
Jay Pharoah, actor
Glenn Plummer, actor
Clifton Powell, actor
Kyla Pratt, actress 
Billy Preston, actor
J. A. Preston, actor
Prince, actor
Joan Pringle, actress
Richard Pryor, actor and comedian
Mekhi Phifer, actor

Q

 Q-Tip, actor and Hip Hop producer 
 Questlove, disc jockey and Hip Hop producer
 Queen Latifah, rapper, actress

R
Issa Rae (African-American mother), actress, comedienne
Dianne Reeves, singer
Marion Ramsey, actress
Gina Ravera (part African-American descent) actress
Lou Rawls, actor
Gene Anthony Ray, actor
Lance Reddick, actor
Della Reese, actress, singer
Rakim, rapper
Daphne Maxwell Reid, actress and comedian
Chance The Rapper, rapper
Tim Reid, actor
Corey Reynolds, actor
James Reynolds, actor
Ving Rhames, actor
Rihanna, singer
Naya Rivera (a quarter African-American descent), actress and singer
Tequan Richmond, actor
Little Richard, actor
LaTanya Richardson, actress
Kevin Michael Richardson, actor
Sam Richardson, actor and comedian
Lionel Richie, actor, composer, singer
Lauren Ridloff, actress
Leonard Roberts, actor
Paul Robeson, actor
Bumper Robinson, actor
Charlie Robinson, actor
Craig Robinson, actor, comedian
Jimmy Robinson, actor
Leon Robinson, actor
Matt Robinson, actor, producer
Roger Robinson, actor
Raekwon, rapper
Smokey Robinson, singer
Chris Rock, actor and comedian
Timmie Rogers, comedian, actor
RZA, actor
Roxie Roker, actress
Joseph Simmons, actor
Esther Rolle, actress
Howard Rollins, actor
Anika Noni Rose, actress
Diana Ross, actress and singer
Evan Ross (African-American mother), actor
Tracee Ellis Ross, actress, model, comedian
Victoria Rowell (African-American father), actress
Richard Roundtree, actor
RuPaul, actor
Nipsey Russell, comedian
Trevante Rhodes, actor

S
Shanice, singer
Sisqo, rapper singer
Zoe Saldana, actress
Amanda Seales (African American father), actress, comedian
Isabel Sanford, actress, comedian
Brandon Scott, actor
Beanie Sigel, rapper
Yara Shahidi (African American mother), actress and Harvard student
Tupac Shakur, actor, rapper
Sherri Shepherd, actress and comedian
O. J. Simpson, actor
Sadat X, rapper
Sinbad, actor and comedian
John Singleton, director, producer, screenwriter
IronE Singleton, actor
Slick Rick, rapper, actor and beatboxer
Isaac C. Singleton Jr., actor
Bubba Smith, actor
Brian Michael Smith, actor
Jada Pinkett Smith (African-American father), actress, singer-songwriter
Justice Smith, actor
Jaden Smith, actor
Will Smith, actor and rapper
Willow Smith, actress
Jussie Smollett, actor
J. B. Smoove, actor and comedian
Wesley Snipes, actor
Sonja Sohn (African-American father), actress and director
Jordin Sparks, actress
Octavia Spencer, actress
Bern Nadette Stanis, actress
Woody Strode, actor
Tika Sumpter, actress
Wanda Sykes, actress and comedian
Jessica Szohr, actress
Carly Simon, singer
Lil Scrappy: Hip hop

T
Larenz Tate, actor
Mr. T, actor
Meshach Taylor, actor
T.I., actor
Nathaniel Taylor, actor
Ron Taylor, actor
Lynne Thigpen, actress
David Jude Jolicoeur, actor
Cora Ann Pair Thomas, missionary
T-Mo, rapper
Leon Thomas III, actor
Treach, rapper
Michelle Thomas, actress, comedian
Tony Yayo, actor
Ernest Lee Thomas, actor
Kenan Thompson, actor, comedian
Tony Todd, actor
Berlinda Tolbert, actress
Chris Tucker, actor, comedian
Glynn Turman, actor
The Game, rapper
Tina Turner, actress, singer
Tyler, the Creator, actor

U
Blair Underwood, actor 
Sheryl Underwood, actress, comedian
Usher, actor, singer

V
Courtney B. Vance, actor
Ben Vereen, actor, dancer, singer
Vin Rock, rapper
Reginald VelJohnson, actor

W
Eugene Wilde, singer
Jimmie Walker, actor 
Bill Walker, actor
Stevie Wonder, singer
Vincent M. Ward, actor
Malcolm-Jamal Warner, actor
Dionne Warwick, actress and singer
Denzel Washington, actor, director and producer; winner of three Golden Globe Awards 
Isaiah Washington, actor
John David Washington, actor 
Kerry Washington (African-American father), actress 
Marlon Wayans, actor, comedian, screenwriter and producer
Damon Wayans, comedian, actor, writer and producer
Damon Wayans Jr., actor, comedian
Shawn Wayans, actor, comedian, writer, producer
Lil Wayne, actor
Carl Weathers, actor
Forest Whitaker, actor
Charles Malik Whitfield, actor
Lynn Whitfield, actress
Jaleel White, actor, comedian
Billy Dee Williams, actor
Deniece Williams, singer
Clarence Williams III, actor
Gary Anthony Williams, actor
Hal Williams, actor
Kellie Shanygne Williams, actress
Michael K. Williams, actor
Tyler James Williams, actor
Vanessa Williams, actress
Fred Williamson, actor
Mykelti Williamson, actor
Larry Wilmore, actor and comedian 
Rutina Wesley, actress
Debra Wilson, actress and comedian
Demond Wilson, actor
Flip Wilson, actor and comedian
Nancy Wilson, actress
Reno Wilson, actor and comedian
Theodore Wilson, actor
Yvette Wilson, actress and comedian
Paul Winfield, actor
Oprah Winfrey, actress, media executive
Jeffrey Wright, actor
Samuel E. Wright, actor
John Witherspoon, actor, comedian
Alfre Woodard, actress
Verdine White, singer, bassist

Y
Yo-Yo, rapper
Lee Thompson Young, actor
Young Buck, rapper

Artists

B 
 Romare Bearden, painter

C 
 Allen 'Big Al' Carter, painter, printmaker, sculptor, photographer

D 
 Rosetta DeBerardinis, painter
 Cheryl Derricotte, glass artist, printmaker

G 
 Sam Gilliam, painter, printmaker

H 
Barkley L. Hendricks, painter and photographer
Nestor Hernandez, photographer

J 
 Suzanne Jackson, artist, gallery owner

L 
 Jacob Lawrence, painter, printmaker

M 
 Percy Martin, printmaker
 Evangeline Montgomery, metal art, printmaker

P 
 Norman Parish, painter, muralist and art dealer
 Jefferson Pinder, performance

S 
 Susan Smith-Pinelo, video, performance
 Renee Stout, sculptor
 Lou Stovall, printmaker

T 
 Alma Thomas, painter

W 
 Carrie Mae Weems, photographer, video
 Kehinde Wiley, portrait painter
 Wilmer Wilson IV, performance, photographer

Astronauts

Michael P. Anderson, NASA Astronaut, Air Force officer
Guion Bluford, NASA Astronaut, aerospace engineer, Air Force officer, fighter pilot
Charles Bolden, NASA Astronaut, administrator
Robert Curbeam, NASA Astronaut
Alvin Drew, NASA Astronaut, Air Force officer
Victor J. Glover, NASA Astronaut
Frederick D. Gregory, NASA Astronaut, administrator
Bernard A. Harris Jr., NASA Astronaut, First African American to walk in space 
Robert Henry Lawrence Jr., USAF Astronaut, First African-American astronaut
Joan Higginbotham, NASA Astronaut, engineer
Mae Jemison, NASA Astronaut, engineer, physician, First African-American woman in space
Leland D. Melvin, NASA Astronaut, engineer
Ronald McNair, NASA Astronaut, physicist
Robert Satcher, NASA Astronaut, physicist, engineer
Winston E. Scott, NASA Astronaut
Stephanie Wilson, NASA Astronaut, engineer

Beauty queens and fashion models
Kimberly Clarice Aiken, Miss America 1994 
Karen Alexander, fashion model 
K. D. Aubert, fashion model
Tyra Banks, fashion model
J. Alexander, fashion model
Deshauna Barber, Miss USA 2016 
Dorothea Church, fashion model 
Pat Cleveland, model 
Lynnette Cole, Miss USA 2000 
Yaya DaCosta, fashion model 
Bruce Darnell, male model 
Jordan Emanuel, Miss Black America New York 2018
Tomiko Fraser, fashion model
Lakita Garth, Miss Black California 1995
Carole Gist, Miss USA 1990 
Quiana Grant, model 
Shauntay Hinton, Miss USA 2002 
Tanisha Harper, model
Chanel Iman (African-American father), fashion model 
Cheslie Kryst, Miss USA 2019 
Kenya Moore, Miss USA 1993 
Kara McCullough, Miss USA 2017
Nana Meriwether (African-American father), Miss USA 2012
Sofia Richie (African-American father), fashion model
Chelsi Smith (African-American father), Miss USA 1995 and Miss Universe 1995
Kimora Lee Simmons (half Korean, half African American)
Darine Stern, first African-American to be on the cover of Playboy magazine
Renee Tenison, first African-American to be selected Playboy Playmate of the year
Jasmine Sanders, model
Eva Marcille, fashion model
Blac Chyna, model
Draya Michele, model
Toccara Jones, model

Fashion designers
Virgil Abloh
Karl Davis
Kanye West
Rasheeda
Mychael Knight
Pepper LaBeija
Willi Smith
Kimora Lee Simmons
Stephen Burrows

Food
Edna Lewis
B. Smith
Hercules Posey
Mashama Bailey

Businesspeople and entrepreneurs

Sports executives and businesspeople

Katrina Adams, current president of the United States Tennis Association 
Koby Altman, current General manager of the Cleveland Cavaliers 
Anucha Browne Sanders, former executive of the New York Knicks 
Pinball Clemons, current vice-chairman for the Toronto Argonauts
Dell Demps, current vice president and general manager of the New Orleans Pelicans 
Joe Dumars, former President of Basketball Operations of the Detroit Pistons
Wayne Embry, first African-American General manager and team president in NBA history, 2x NBA Executive of the Year
Rube Foster, former executive of the Chicago American Giants
Rod Higgins, former president of Basketball Operations for the Charlotte Bobcats
Billy Hunter, former executive director of the National Basketball Players Association 
Al Haymon, manager and adviser to Floyd Mayweather Jr.
Michael Huyghue, former Commissioner of the United Football League 
Stu Jackson, former executive vice president of the National Basketball Association, current associate Commissioner of the Big East Conference
Magic Johnson, current president of Basketball Operations for the Los Angeles Lakers, part-owner of the Los Angeles Dodgers, owner of the Los Angeles Sparks, and co-owner of the Los Angeles Football Club 
Michael Jordan, current principal owner and chairman of the Charlotte Hornets. 
Billy King, former general manager of the Brooklyn Nets
Don King, former boxing promoter
Billy Knight, former general manager and executive vice president of the Atlanta Hawks
Billy McKinney, former vice president of Basketball Operations for the Detroit Pistons, Executive vice president for both Seattle SuperSonics and Seattle Storm
Steve Mills, current executive of the New York Knicks
Ozzie Newsome, current general manager of the Baltimore Ravens 
Jerry Reese, former general manager of the New York Giants

Businesspeople

Alton Abraham, former social entrepreneur and business manager for Sun Ra 
Wally Amos, founder of the Famous Amos chocolate chip cookie brand 
Donna Auguste, former founder of Freshwater Software 
Leonard C. Bailey, business owner and inventor
Tyra Banks, television personality, former model 
LaVar Ball, owner of the Big Baller Brand sports apparel
Christiana Carteaux Bannister, hairdressing business 
ASAP Bari, co-founder of ASAP Mob and VLONE Clothing 
Andre Barnett, founder of the Information Technology Company WiseDome INC 
Beyoncé, co-founder of Tidal
Sarah Bickford, former owner of Virginia City Water Company
Dave Bing, owner of Bing Steel
Chris Brown, founder of the record label CBE
Herman Cain, business executive
Demmette Guidry, music industry executive 
Kerry S. Harris, entrepreneur 
Robert L. Johnson, co-founder of BET and RLJ Companies
Lisa S. Jones, founder and CEO of EyeMail Inc.
Walter P. Lomax Jr., founder of Lomax Health Systems 
Mary Ellen Pleasant, real estate magnate
Henry A. Tandy, founder Tandy&Burns stone masonry and construction firm
Vertner Woodson Tandy, first African American architect State of New York and founder of Kappa Phi Alpha fraternity
Madam C. J. Walker, businessperson, hair care entrepreneur, philanthropist, and activist
Gertrude Pocte Geddes Willis, owner of the Gertrude Geddes Willis Life Insurance Company and Gertrude Geddes Willis Funeral Home

Cinematographers

B
Charles Burnett, cinematographer, director

D
Ernest Dickerson, cinematographer

H
James E. Hinton, cinematographer

J
Arthur Jafa, cinematographer

K
Kira Kelly, cinematographer

M
Jessie Maple, cinematographer
Janks Morton, cinematographer

S
Malik Hassan Sayeed, cinematographer

Y
Bradford Young, cinematographer

Civil rights leaders and activists

A
Ralph Abernathy, civil rights activist and minister
Muhammad Ali, civil rights activist
Maya Angelou, civil rights activist, writer, poet

B
Ella Baker, civil rights activist
James Baldwin, civil rights activist, novelist, playwright
Marion Barry, civil rights activist, politician
Daisy Bates, civil rights activist, publisher, journalist, lecturer
Mary McLeod Bethune, civil rights activist, educator
James Bevel, minister, leader of the civil rights movement 
Sojourner Truth, civil rights activist
Gloria Blackwell, civil rights activist, educator
Unita Blackwell, civil rights activist
W. E. B. Du Bois, civil rights activist
Julian Bond, civil rights activist, professor and writer
Ruby Bridges, civil rights activist
Ralph Bunche, civil rights activist, scientist, academic, diplomat

C
Beatrice Morrow Cannady, civil rights activist, publisher
Bunchy Carter, civil rights activist
Jeannette Carter (1886–1964), lawyer, labor organizer, and suffragist
Julius L. Chambers, civil rights activist
Fannie Lee Chaney, civil rights activist
James Chaney, civil rights activist
Shirley Chisholm, civil rights activist, educator
Xernona Clayton, civil rights activist
Septima Poinsette Clark, civil rights activist, educator
Eldridge Cleaver, civil rights activist
Kathleen Cleaver, civil rights activist
Charles E. Cobb Jr., civil rights activist, journalist, professor
John Conyers, civil rights activist
Vivian E. J. Cook, educator and activist
Marvel Cooke, civil rights activist 
Annie Lee Cooper, civil rights activist
Dorothy Cotton, civil rights activist
Claudette Colvin, civil rights activist, nurse
Elijah Cummings, civil rights advocate

D
Angela Davis, civil rights activist, academic, and author
Ossie Davis, civil rights activist
Ruby Dee, civil rights activist
Doris Derby, civil rights activist, photographer
Frederick Douglass, abolitionist, black rights activist, women's rights activist, organizer

E
Marian Wright Edelman, civil rights activist
Charles Evers, civil rights activist
Medgar Evers, civil rights activist
Myrlie Evers-Williams, civil rights activist

F
James L. Farmer Jr., civil rights activist
Walter E. Fauntroy, civil rights activist
Sarah Mae Flemming, civil rights activist
James Forman, civil rights activist
Aretha Franklin, civil rights activist
C. L. Franklin, civil rights activist, minister
Elizabeth Freeman, first former slave to win a freedom suit in Massachusetts
Frankie Muse Freeman, civil rights activist, attorney

G
Fred Gray, civil rights lawyer
Dick Gregory, civil rights activist

H
Vincent Harding, civil rights activist, historian
Curtis W. Harris, civil rights activist, minister, politician 
Fannie Lou Hamer, civil rights activist
Fred Hampton, civil rights activist
Lorraine Hansberry, civil rights activist, playwright, author
Robert Hayling, civil rights activist, dentist
Lola Hendricks, civil rights activist, secretary
Aaron Henry, civil rights activist, politician
Dorothy Height, educator and civil rights activist
Benjamin Hooks, civil rights activist, minister, attorney
Lena Horne, civil rights activist
Elbert Howard, civil rights activist
T. R. M. Howard, civil rights leader, entrepreneur, surgeon
Bobby Hutton, civil rights activist

J
George Jackson, civil rights activist, author
Jesse Jackson, civil rights activist
Jimmie Lee Jackson, civil rights activist
Mahalia Jackson, civil rights activist
Richie Jean Jackson, civil rights activist, author, teacher
T. J. Jemison, civil rights activist, minister
James Weldon Johnson, writer of Black National Anthem
Clarence B. Jones, civil rights activist
Barbara Jordan, civil rights activist
Vernon Jordan, civil rights activist

K
A. D. King, civil rights activist
Alveda King, civil rights activist, author, politician
Bernice King, civil rights activist, minister
Coretta Scott King, civil rights activist
Dexter King, civil rights activist
Martin Luther King III, civil rights activist
Martin Luther King Jr., civil rights leader and pastor
Martin Luther King Sr., civil rights leader, pastor and missionary
Alberta Williams King, civil rights activist
Yolanda King, civil rights activist
Eartha Kitt, civil rights activist

L
Bernard Lafayette, civil rights activist, organizer
Sarah Willie Layton, suffragist, civil rights activist
James Lawson, civil rights activist, professor
John Lewis, congressman, Nashville Student Movement, organizer
Joseph Lowery, civil rights activist and minister
Julius Lester, civil rights activist, author, professor
Conrad Lynn, civil rights activist, lawyer

M
Thurgood Marshall, civil rights activist, lawyer, judge
Benjamin Mays, civil rights activist, minister
Franklin McCain, civil rights activist
Floyd McKissick, civil rights activist, lawyer
James Meredith, civil rights figure, writer, political adviser
Anne Moody, civil rights activist, author
Harry T. Moore, civil rights activist, educator
Harriette Moore, civil rights worker, educator
Amzie Moore, civil rights leader, entrepreneur
Bob Moses, civil rights activist, educator
Elijah Muhammad, civil rights leader
Pauli Murray, civil rights activist, lawyer, author, priest

N
Diane Nash, civil rights activist
Huey P. Newton, civil rights activist
Denise Nicholas, civil rights activist
Nellie B. Nicholson, suffragist
E. D. Nixon, civil rights activist, NCAAP official

O
James Orange, civil rights activist

P
Rosa Parks, activist, NCAAP official, Montgomery Bus Boycott inspiration
James Peck, civil rights activist
Adam Clayton Powell Jr., civil rights activist, pastor
Gloria Johnson-Powell, civil rights activist

R
Lincoln Ragsdale, civil rights activist, aviator
A. Philip Randolph, civil rights activist
George Raymond, civil rights activist
George Raymond Jr., civil rights activist
Frederick D. Reese, civil rights activist, educator, minister
Gloria Richardson, civil rights activist
David Richmond, civil rights activist
Paul Robeson, civil rights activist
Amelia Boynton Robinson, civil rights activist
Jackie Robinson, civil rights activist
Jo Ann Robinson, civil rights activist
Bayard Rustin, civil rights activist
Josephine St. Pierre Ruffin, civil rights activist

S
Cleveland Sellers, civil rights activist, educator
Betty Shabazz, civil rights activist
Al Sharpton, civil rights activist, minister
Charles Sherrod, civil rights activist, minister
Fred Shuttlesworth, civil rights activist
Nina Simone, civil rights activist
Mavis Staples, civil rights activist
Charles Kenzie Steele, civil rights activist
Charles Steele Jr., civil rights activist, politician

T
Harriet Tubman, abolitionist and humanitarian 
Samuel Wilbert Tucker, civil rights activist, lawyer

V
C. T. Vivian, civil rights activist, author, minister

W
Wyatt Tee Walker, pastor, civil rights leader
Booker T. Washington, educator, founder of Tuskegee University
Ida B. Wells, civil rights activist
Cornel West, civil rights activist, philosopher, author, minister
Roy Wilkins, civil rights activist
Hosea Williams, civil rights activist, minister, businessman, philanthropist, scientist, politician
Robert F. Williams, civil rights leader, author
Myrlie Evers-Williams, civil rights activist

X
Malcolm X, human rights activist, minister

Y
Andrew Young, politician, diplomat, and activist
Whitney Young, civil rights activist
Sammy Younge Jr., civil rights activist

Government and politics

 African Americans in the United States Congress
 African-American officeholders in the United States, 1789–1866
 List of African-American jurists
 List of African-American leftists
 List of African-American officeholders during Reconstruction
 List of African-American United States Cabinet members
 List of African-American United States presidential and vice presidential candidates
 List of African-American United States representatives
 List of African-American United States senators
 List of first African-American mayors

President
 Barack Obama, (Kenyan-American father) 2009–2017, 44th president of the United States

Vice president
 Kamala Harris, (Jamaican-American father) 2021–present, 49th vice president of the United States

Supreme Court Justices
 Thurgood Marshall, 1967-1991
 Clarence Thomas, 1991–present
 Ketanji Brown Jackson, 2022–present

Governors
Archie Alexander, former governor of the U.S. Virgin Islands 
David Paterson (African-American mother), served as the 55th Governor of New York. 
Deval Patrick, served as the 71st Governor of Massachusetts from 2007 to 2015, so far the only African American to serve as Governor of Massachusetts. 
P.B.S. Pinchback, served as the 24th Governor of Louisiana from 1872 to 1873, the first African American to become governor of a U.S. State. 
Douglas Wilder, served as the 66th Governor of Virginia, became the first elected African-American governor, became the first African American to serve as governor of U.S. State since Reconstruction.

Other political fields
Perry B. Jackson, first African American elected judge in the state of Ohio.
Valerie Jarrett, former senior advisor to former president Barack Obama, and co-chair of the Obama-Biden Transition project.
 Mazi Melesa Pilip, Ethiopian-born American politician

Historical
 List of African-American abolitionists
 List of African-American officeholders during Reconstruction

Journalism and media

 
 
 

Al Roker, journalist
Daisy Bates, journalist
Ed Bradley, former host of 60 Minutes, on CBS
James Brown, host of The NFL Today on CBS
Victor Blackwell, CNN news anchor
Cari Champion, journalist, host of ESPN's SportsCenter. 
Ta-Nehisi Coates, author, journalist
Sway Calloway, journalist, radio personality.
Elle Duncan (African-American father), sports anchor for ESPN's SportsCenter.
Harris Faulkner, television host and anchor for Fox News.
Bryant Gumbel, host of HBO's Real Sports with Bryant Gumbel 
Charlamagne tha God, radio personality, television personality, radio host of The Breakfast Club.
Greg Gumbel, sportscaster for NFL on CBS
Nia-Malika Henderson, CNN political reporter 
Lester Holt, journalist and anchor for NBC News
Marc Lamont Hill, journalist, political commentator 
Jemele Hill, sports journalist for ESPN's The Undefeated 
Jay Harris, journalist and anchor for ESPN
Omar Jimenez, journalist
Jason Johnson, writer, political commentator
Van Jones, CNN political commentator 
Sheinelle Jones, journalist and news anchor for NBC News and MSNBC
Gayle King, journalist, television personality, co-anchor of CBS This Morning 
Don Lemon, journalist, author, CNN anchor
Craig Melvin, news anchor for NBC News and MSNBC 
Curt Menefee, host of Fox NFL Sunday 
Michelle Miller, national correspondent for CBS News
Roland Martin, commentator for TV One
Zerlina Maxwell, MSNBC political analyst 
Sophia A. Nelson, columnist
Candace Owens, conservative commentator, regularly appears on Fox News 
Rob Parker, sports analysis for Fox Sports
Leonard Pitts, journalist for the Miami Herald
April Ryan, journalist
Eugene Robinson, 2009 Pulitzer Prize winner, columnist and associate editor of The Washington Post 
Max Robinson, broadcast journalist for ABC World News Tonight
Angela Rye, CNN political commentator
Omari Salisbury, independent journalist and founder of Converge Media in Seattle, Washington
David Swerdlick (African-American mother), journalist for the Washington Post 
Al Sharpton, host of MSNBC's PoliticsNation 
Bernard Shaw, former lead news anchor for CNN 
Sara Sidner, journalist, correspondent for CNN
Michael Smith, ESPN commentator
Stuart Scott, former sports anchor for ESPN's Sports Center 
Stephen A. Smith, journalist, radio host for ESPN 
Symone Sanders, CNN political commentator 
Bakari Sellers, CNN political commentator
Kristen Welker (African-American mother), MSNBC White House Correspondent for NBC News
Fredricka Whitfield, news anchor for CNN Newsroom 
LeRoy Whitfield, journalist
Jason Whitlock, sports journalist
Michael Wilbon, journalist, columnist

Lawyers

Robert Sengstacke Abbott, lawyer, newspaper publisher, editor
Raymond Pace Alexander, lawyer, politician, civil rights activist
Sadie Tanner Mossell Alexander, lawyer
Anita L. Allen, lawyer, professor
Helen Elsie Austin, lawyer
Ferdinand Lee Barnett, lawyer, journalist
Derrick Bell, lawyer, professor, civil rights activist
Tom Bradley, lawyer, politician
Roland Burris, lawyer, politician
Eunice Carter, lawyer 
William Calvin Chase, lawyer, newspaper editor
Julius L. Chambers, lawyer, civil rights activist, educator
Laura Coates, attorney, law professor
Johnnie Cochran, lawyer
William Thaddeus Coleman Jr., lawyer, politician
Mo Cowan, lawyer, politician
Christopher Darden, lawyer, author, actor, lecturer, practicing attorney
Artur Davis, lawyer, politician
Gordon Davis, lawyer
James Dean, lawyer, activist, businessperson, deacon, first African-American appointed as a judge in Florida
Carl E. Douglas, lawyer
B. Kwaku Duren, lawyer, educator, writer, editor
Larry Elder, lawyer, author, radio show host
Keith Ellison, lawyer, politician
Karen Freeman-Wilson, lawyer, judge
Walter A. Gordon, lawyer
Fred Gray, civil rights lawyer
Al Green, lawyer, politician
A. Leon Higginbotham Jr., lawyer, author, civil rights advocate, federal court judge
Anita Hill, lawyer, academic
Curtis Hill, lawyer, prosecutor
Eric Holder, lawyer, 82nd United States Attorney General 
Sunny Hostin (African American father), lawyer
Benjamin Hooks, lawyer, minister, civil rights activist
Valerie Jarrett, lawyer, businesswoman, government official
Jeh Johnson, lawyer, government official
Barbara Jordan, lawyer, educator, politician, civil rights activist
Eddie Jordan, lawyer
Vernon Jordan, lawyer, business executive, civil rights activist
Florynce Kennedy, lawyer, civil rights advocate
Leondra Kruger, lawyer
Reginald Lewis, lawyer, businessman
William H. Lewis, lawyer
Lori Lightfoot, lawyer, politician
Loretta Lynch, lawyer, 83rd United States Attorney General
Conrad Lynn, lawyer, civil rights activist
Thurgood Marshall, lawyer, judge
Thurgood Marshall Jr., lawyer
Wade H. McCree, lawyer, judge, professor
Robert Morris, lawyer
Constance Baker Motley, lawyer, judge, politician, civil rights activist
Pauli Murray, lawyer, author, priest, civil rights activist
Ronald Noble, lawyer
Barack Obama, former president of the United States
Deval Patrick, lawyer, author, businessman, politician
Charlotte E. Ray, lawyer, first African-American female lawyer
Terri Sewell, lawyer, politician
Bryan Stevenson, lawyer, professor
Clarence Thomas, lawyer, judge, government official
Jordan A. Thomas, lawyer, writer
Larry Thompson, lawyer
Samuel Wilbert Tucker, lawyer
Mel Watt, lawyer, politician
Tony West, lawyer

Military
 List of African-American Medal of Honor recipients

Ministers and other religious leaders

 Ralph Abernathy
 Richard Allen
 Thea Bowman
 Alexander Crummell
 Henriette DeLille
 Louis Farrakhan
 Henry Highland Garnet
 Julia Greeley
 Wilton Gregory
 Jesse Jackson
 Mother Mary Lange
 Martin Luther King Jr.
 Malcolm X
 Warith Deen Mohammed
 Elijah Muhammad
 Al Sharpton
 Augustus Tolton
 Pierre and Juliette Toussaint
 T. D. Jakes
 Benjamin Hooks
 Vashti Murphy McKenzie
 Raphael G. Warnock
 Calvin O. Butts III
 Kirbyjon Caldwell
 Joseph H. Walker III
 J. Edgar Boyd
 Delman Coates
 Fred Luter Jr.
 Michael Todd

Novelists and poets

 Ron Allen, poet, playwright
 Elizabeth Alexander, poet, essayist, playwright
 Maya Angelou, novelist, poet, and activist
 James Baldwin, novelist, playwright, and activist
 Amiri Baraka, poet, writer, activist, and essayist
 Gwendolyn B. Bennett, poet, writer, journalist, and artist
 Arna Bontemps, poet, novelist, and librarian
 Gwendolyn Brooks, poet, author, teacher
 Lucille Clifton, poet, writer, and educator
 Jayne Cortez, poet, activist, publisher
 Katherine Jackson, writer and novelist
 Countee Cullen, poet, novelist, and playwright
 Frank Marshall Davis, poet, journalist
 Samuel R. Delany, novelist, author, editor, professor, and literary critic
 Paul Laurence Dunbar, poet, novelist
 Ralph Ellison, novelist, literary critic, and scholar
 Percival Everett, novelist
 Nikki Giovanni, poet, writer, commentator, activist, and educator
 Alex Haley, novelist, author
 Lorraine Hansberry, playwright
 Frances Harper, poet
 Yona Harvey, poet, professor
 Robert Hayden, poet, essayist, and educator
 Gil Scott-Heron, poet, author
 Chester Himes, novelist
 Langston Hughes, poet, activist, novelist, playwright, and columnist
 Erica Hunt, poet, essayist, and teacher
 Zora Neale Hurston, novelist
 Nella Larsen, novelist, librarian, and nurse
 Brent Leggs, historian and preservationist, writer, academic
 Alain LeRoy Locke, writer
 Louise Meriwether, novelist, essayist, journalist and activist
 Toni Morrison, novelist, essayist, editor, teacher and professor
 Walter Mosley, novelist
 Walter Dean Myers, novelist
 Marilyn Nelson, poet, translator, professor
 Pat Parker, poet, activist
 Leonard Pitts, novelist, commentator, journalist, and columnist
 Kevin Powell, poet, activist
 Ishmael Reed, poet, novelist, essayist, songwriter, playwright, editor, and publisher
 Shawn Stewart Ruff, novelist
 Sonia Sanchez, poet, playwright, essayist, educator, and activist
 Patricia Smith, poet, playwright, author, teacher, and journalist
 Tracy K. Smith, poet, educator
 Ntozake Shange, novelist, playwright and poet
 Natasha Trethewey, poet, professor
 Alice Walker, novelist, writer, poet, and activist
 Margaret Walker, novelist, poet and writer
 Dorothy West, novelist, columnist
 Phillis Wheatley, poet
 Colson Whitehead, novelist
 John Edgar Wideman, novelist, author, and professor
 John A. Williams, novelist, journalist, and academic
 Harriet E. Wilson, novelist
 Richard Wright, novelist, poet, and essayist
 Sarah E. Wright, novelist

 Frank Yerby, novelist
 Al Young, poet, novelist, essayist, screenwriter, and professor
 Kevin Young, poet, professor, editor, and literary critic

Publishers 
 W. Paul Coates, founder of Black Classic Press
 Jayne Cortez, founder of Bola Press

 Charles F. Harris, founder of Amistad Press
 John H. Johnson
 Naomi Long Madgett, poet and founder of Lotus Press
 Haki Madhubuti, co-founder of Third World Press
 Dudley Randall, founder of Broadside Press
 Ishmael Reed
 Glenn Thompson, co-founder of Writers and Readers Cooperative

Singers and musicians

A
Aaliyah: R&B, pop
Johnny Ace: R&B
Armenta Adams: Classical pianist
Arthur Adams: Blues, R&B
Johnny Adams: Gospel, R&B, soul, jazz
Yolanda Adams: Gospel, R&B
Nat Adderley: Jazz
Cannonball Adderley: Jazz
Jhene Aiko: R&B, hip hop 
Akon: R&B, pop, hip hop, dancehall 
Sasha Allen: R&B, rock, soul
Luther Allison: Blues
Amil: Hip hop
Cat Anderson: Jazz
Ivie Anderson: Jazz
Louis Armstrong: Jazz
Billy Boy Arnold: R&B
Dorothy Ashby: Jazz
Patti Austin: R&B, pop, jazz
Roy Ayers: Jazz, funk, disco, R&B, hip hop
Ayo & Teo: (African American father) Hip hop, dance, trap
Ashanti: R&B

B
Cardi B: Hip hop
Babyface: R&B
Anthony Brown: Gospel
Erykah Badu: Neo soul, R&B, funk, hip hop 
Kim Burrell: Gospel
Lil Baby: Hip hop
Mildred Bailey: Jazz
Pearl Bailey: Vaudeville
Anita Baker, R&B, soul
Josephine Baker: Pop, jazz
Lavern Baker: R&B
Erica Banks: Hip hop, Southern hip hop
Lloyd Banks: Hip hop 
Azealia Banks: Hip hop
Dave Bartholomew: R&B, R&R
Florence Ballard: R&B, pop, soul
Fantasia Barrino: R&B, soul, gospel
Count Basie: Jazz
Swizz Beatz: Hip hop (African-American and Eritrean descent)
Sidney Bechet: Jazz
Madeline Bell: Soul
Carey Bell: Blues
Eric Benet: R&B, neo soul
George Benson: Jazz, R&B, soul, funk
Denee Benton: Broadway, pop
Chuck Berry: Rock and roll
Frankie Beverly: R&B, soul, funk
Beyoncé: R&B, pop
Cindy Birdsong: R&B, soul, pop
Birdman: rapper
Kodak Black: Hip hop
Mykki Blanco: Hip hop
Bobby Bland: Blues, R&B, soul
Blind Blake: Ragtime, blues
Art Blakey: Jazz
Mary J. Blige: R&B, hip hop, soul
Joe Budden: Hip hop
Lucille Bogan: 
Buddy Bolden: Jazz, blues
Bobby Bradford: Jazz
Charles Bradley: Funk, soul, R&B
Tamar Braxton: R&B, soul, pop, gospel
Toni Braxton: R&B, soul, pop
Traci Braxton: R&B, soul, pop
Trina Braxton: R&B, soul, pop
Dee Dee Bridgewater: Jazz
Bobby Brown: R&B, soul, pop
Charles Brown: Blues, R&B, rock, soul, jazz
Chris Brown: R&B, hip hop, pop
Chuck Brown: Funk, hip hop, blues
Clifford Brown: Jazz
James Brown: Soul, funk
Oscar Brown, Jr: Jazz
Peabo Bryson: Soul, R&B
Elbridge "Al" Bryant: R&B, pop, soul
Solomon Burke: Blues, gospel, R&B, soul, rock and roll 
Metro Boomin: Hip hop
Jerry Butler: Soul, funk, R&B
Rich Boy: Hip hop
Soulja Boy: Hip hop
Donald Byrd: Jazz, funk, soul, R&B
B.o.B: Hip hop
Bow Wow: Hip hop
Boosie Badazz: Southern hip hop
Rich Boy: Hip hop
Young Buck: Hip hop
Joe Budden: Hip hop

C
Ca$h Out: Hip hop
C-Murder: Hip hop
Cassidy: Hip hop
Doja Cat: Hip hop, R&B, pop
Erica Campbell: Gospel
Tina Campbell: Gospel
Cab Calloway: Jazz 
2 Chainz: Hip hop, dirty South/Southern hip hop
Cam'ron: Hip hop
Mariah Carey: R&B, pop, Hip hop, soul
Benny Carter: Jazz
Betty Carter: Jazz
Ron Carter: Jazz
Shawn Carter, known as Jay-Z: Hip hop
Playboi Carti: Hip hop, trap, SoundCloud rap
Tracy Chapman: Folk
Paul Chambers: Jazz
Ray Charles: R&B, soul, blues, gospel, country, jazz, rock and roll, pop
Chubby Checker: Rock and roll, R&B
Cyrus Chestnut: Jazz
Charlie Christian: Jazz
Milan Christopher: Rapper
Blac Chyna: Hip hop 
Ciara: R&B, Hip hop, pop
Robert Cray: Blues
Otis Clay: R&B, soul, blues, gospel
Eddy Clearwater: Blues
Clarence Clemons: Rock, R&B
James Cleveland: Gospel, soul
George Clinton: Funk, rock, soul
Keyshia Cole: R&B, soul, hip hop
Nat King Cole: Jazz, pop
Natalie Cole: R&B, pop
Ornette Coleman: Jazz, free funk
Daryl Coley: Gospel
Albert Collins: Blues
Bootsy Collins: Funk, soul, rock, R&B
Mitty Collier: R&B, soul, gospel
Alice Coltrane: Jazz
John Coltrane: Jazz
Ravi Coltrane: Jazz
Sean Combs: Hip hop, R&B
Sam Cooke: Soul, gospel, R&B
James Cotton: Blues, jazz
Randy Crawford: Jazz, R&B, disco 
J. Cole: Hip hop (African-American father)
Ice Cube: Hip hop
Kid Cudi: Rapper who is African American and Mexican
King Curtis: Soul, R&B, rock, funk, jazz
Evelyn Simpson Curenton: various
Chamillionaire: Hip hop
Chingy: Hip hop, rap
Canon: Christian hip hop
Cuban Doll: Hip hop, Southern hip hop

D
Roscoe Dash: Hip hop
Miles Davis: Jazz
Sammy Davis Jr.: Pop, jazz
Jimmy Dawkins: Blues
DDG: Hip hop
Mos Def: Hip hop
Famous Dex, Chicago hip hop
Bo Diddley: R&B, rock and roll
Ricky Dillard: Gospel
Willie Dixon, Blues, R&B, rock and roll, gospel
Johnny Dodds: Jazz
Warren "Baby" Dodds: Jazz
Young Dolph: Hip hop
Eric Dolphy: Jazz
Donnis: Hip hop 
Nate Dogg: Hip hop, gangsta rap, R&B
Snoop Dogg: Hip hop, funk, gangsta rap 
Fats Domino: Rock and roll, R&B
Dr. Dre: Hip hop
42 Dugg: Hip hop, trap
Lil Durk: Hip hop, drill
Desiigner: Hip hop, trap
Derek Minor: Christian hip hop
DreamDoll: Hip hop
Dorrough: Hip hop
Duke Deuce: Hip hop

E
E-40: Hip hop, rap
Eazy-E: Hip-hop, rap
Dennis Edwards: R&B, soul
Billy Eckstine: Jazz, pop 
Roy Eldridge: Jazz
Duke Ellington: Jazz
Betty Everett: soul 
Faith Evans (African-American mother): R&B, soul, hip-hop

F
Art Farmer: Jazz
Mickey Fields: Jazz
Ella Fitzgerald: Jazz
Roberta Flack: Jazz, pop
Eddie Floyd: R&B, soul
Aretha Franklin: Soul 
BabyFace: R&B singer
Kam Franklin: Soul
Kirk Franklin: Gospel, Christian hip hop 
Melvin Franklin: R&B, soul
Bankroll Freddie: Hip hop
Lowell Fulson: Blues
Future: Hip hop, trap, R&B 
Fabolous: Hip hop 
Flo Rida: Hip hop
Sonny Fortune: Jazz
Jaime Foxx: R&B
Flavor Flav: Hip hop
Fivio Foreign: Hip hop
Big Freedia: Bounce
Flame: Christian hip hop
Finesse2tymes: Hip hop
Foogiano: Hip hop
Fredo Bang: Hip hop

G
Polo G: Hip hop, drill
Slim Gaillard: Jazz
Marvin Gaye: R&B, soul, funk, jazz, pop
Gloria Gaynor: Disco, R&B
The Game: Rapper
EST Gee: Hip hop
Tyrese Gibson: Hip hop, R&B
Dizzy Gillespie: Jazz
Ginuwine: R&B
City Girls: Hip hop
GloRilla: Hip hop
GlokkNine: Hip hop
Ugly God: Hip hop, SoundCloud hip hop 
Benny Golson: Jazz
Dexter Gordon: Jazz
Berry Gordy: R&B, soul, pop, R&R
Al Green: R&B, soul 
CeeLo Green: R&B, Hip hop, soul, funk
Thomasina Talley Greene: Classical pianist
Johnny Griffin: Jazz
Lil Gotit, Hip hop
Tee Grizzley, Rapper
Childish Gambino: Hip hop, R&B
Gucci Mane: Hip hop 
Gunna: Hip hop
George Benson: Singer
Buddy Guy: Blues
Phil Guy: Blues

H
Andrew Hill: Jazz
Adelaide Hall: Jazz
Edmond Hall: Jazz
Willie Hall: R&B, soul, funk
Halsey: Pop
Charles Hamilton: Hip hop
Chico Hamilton: Jazz
Jimmy Hamilton: Jazz
Lionel Hampton: Jazz 
Deitrick Haddon: Gospel
Herbie Hancock: Jazz, funk, electro
Donny Hathaway: Soul, jazz, R&B
Edward W. Hardy: Classical, pop, theatre music
Roy Hargrove: Jazz, soul
Damon Harris: R&B, soul, pop
Richie Havens: Funk, soul
Coleman Hawkins: Jazz
Isaac Hayes: Blues, jazz, soul 
MC Hammer: R&B 
Fred Hammond: Gospel
Fletcher Henderson: Jazz
Michael Henderson: R&B, jazz, funk, soul, pop
Jimi Hendrix: Rock, blues, R&B
Jon Hendricks: Jazz
Nona Hendryx: Funk, soul
G Herbo: Hip hop, drill
Gil Scott-Heron: Soul, funk, R&B
Skinny Hightower: Jazz
Lauryn Hill: R&B, neo soul, folk
Earl "Fatha" Hines: Jazz
Johnny Hodges: Jazz
Billie Holiday: Jazz, blues
Jennifer Holliday: R&B, soul, pop
John Lee Hooker: Blues
Hopsin: Hip hop
Lena Horne: Jazz, pop
Cissy Houston: Soul, disco
Thelma Houston: R&B, soul
Whitney Houston: R&B, soul, pop
Freddie Hubbard: Jazz
Jennifer Hudson: R&B, soul, pop
Nipsey Hussle: Hip hop, rap
Phyllis Hyman: R&B, jazz 
H.E.R.: R&B 
Koryn Hawthorne: Gospel
Keri Hilson: R&B
Hitmaka: Hip hop
Huey: Hip hop
Hurricane Chris: Hip hop

I
James Ingram: R&B, pop, soul
Luther Ingram: R&B, soul
Ronald Isley: R&B, soul 
T.I.: Hip hop
Ice-T: Hip hop

J
Ray J: R&B
Stevie J: Hip hop, R&B
Bernard Jackson: R&B
Chuck Jackson: R&B 
Freddie Jackson: Soul 
Jackie Jackson: Pop, R&B, soul
Janet Jackson: R&B, pop 
Jeremih: R&B
Jermaine Jackson: Pop, R&B, soul, funk
La Toya Jackson: Pop, R&B, soul, dance
Marlon Jackson: Pop, R&B, soul
Michael Jackson: Pop, soul, R&B, soul, funk, rock 
Randy Jackson: Pop, R&B, soul
Rebbie Jackson: Pop, R&B, soul
Tito Jackson: Pop, R&B, soul, blues
Mahalia Jackson: Gospel
Millie Jackson: Soul, disco, R&B 
Milt Jackson: Jazz
Etta James: Blues, R&B, soul, jazz 
Rick James: R&B, soul, funk, rock
Al Jarreau: Jazz, R&B, soul 
BlocBoy JB: Hip hop
Young Joc: Hip hop
Booker T. Jones: R&B, soul, blues
Elvin Jones: Jazz
Etta Jones: Jazz 
Hank Jones: Jazz
Howard Jones: Rock, metal
Quincy Jones: R&B, funk, soul, jazz, hip hop, rock and roll, pop
Louis Jordan: Jazz, blues, R&B
Steve Jordan: Pop, rock, R&B
J. J. Johnson: Jazz
Robert Johnson: Blues
Syl Johnson: R&B, blues
Little Willie John: R&B, soul
Charles Jenkins: Gospel
Leroy Jenkins: Jazz
Valerie June: Folk, blues, soul, pop 
Jeremih: Hip hop, R&B 
LL Cool J: Hip hop
Scott Joplin: Ragtime
Lil Jon: Hip hop
Jadakiss: Hip hop
J-Kwon: Hip hop
Mike Jones: Hip hop
Jibbs: Hip hop
Juelz Santana: Hip hop

K
Lil Keed: Hip hop
Eddie Kendricks: R&B, soul, disco
Alicia Keys (African American father): R&B, soul, jazz, hip hop
Gladys Knight: soul, R&B, pop 
Chief Keef, rapper
Kelis: Hip hop (African American, Chinese and Puerto Rican) 
R Kelly: R&B, soul, gospel, hip hop
Wynton Kelly: Jazz
Khalid: R&B, pop
Wiz Khalifa: Hip hop 
Kid Cudi: Hip hop 
Kehlani (African American father): R&B, soul, jazz, hip hop
Solange Knowles: R&B, soul, funk
Rich the Kid: Hip hop, trap
Albert King: Blues
B.B. King: Blues, R&B
Ben E. King: R&B, soul, pop
Freddie King: Blues
Eartha Kitt: Vocal jazz, cabaret, dance, torch
Maxo Kream: Hip hop (Nigerian and African-American)
KB: Christian hip hop

L
Big L: Hip hop
Patti LaBelle: R&B, soul, disco, dance, funk 
Denise LaSalle: Blues, R&B, soul
Bettye LaVette: Soul, blues, R&B, funk, rock, country, gospel
John Legend: R&B, soul, pop
Lakeyah: Hip hop
Kendrick Lamar: Hip hop, rap 
John Larkin: Vaudeville
Lynda Laurence: R&B, pop, jazz
Lecrae: Christian hip hop 
Huddie Ledbetter: Folk, blues 
Tasha Cobbs Leonard: Gospel
Eddie Levert: R&B, soul, blues, gospel
Gerald Levert: Soul, R&B
Frankie Lyman: R&B, pop 
Swae Lee, Rapper
Coi Leray: Hip hop
Booker Little: Jazz
Barbara Lynn: R&B
Cheryl Lynn: Disco, R&B, soul, pop
Lisa Lopes: R&B, rap, pop
Lecrae: Christian hip hop 
Ledisi: R&B, soul, jazz
Logic: Hip hop
Dej Loaf: Hip hop, R&B
Ludacris: Hip hop
Lil Uzi Vert: Hip hop
Lil Nas X: Hip hop, country
Lizzo: R&B
Lloyd: R&B
Trip Lee: Christian hip hop, Southern hip hop
Lil Scrappy: Hip hop

M
Young M.A: Hip hop 
Mandisa: Gospel, Christian
Christian McBride: Jazz
Gene McDaniels: Jazz, pop
Donnie McClurkin: Gospel
Betty McGlown: R&B, pop
Joe McPhee: Jazz
Remy Ma: Hip hop 
Lee Michelle: (African-American Father) K Pop singer
Buddy Miles: R&B, funk, soul
Meek Mill: Hip hop
Stephanie Mills: R&B, soul, gospel
Nicki Minaj: Hip hop, pop, R&B
Blue Mitchell: Jazz
Barbara Martin: R&B, pop
Johnny Mathis: Pop, jazz 
Curtis Mayfield: Soul, funk, R&B
Taj Mahal: Blues, R&B, jazz
Hank Mobley: Jazz
Thelonious Monk: Jazz
Wes Montgomery: Jazz
Melba Moore: Soul, disco, gospel
Lee Morgan: Jazz
Wanya Morris: R&B, soul 
Migos: Hip hop, trap
Gucci Mane: Hip hop, trap 
Miguel (African-American Mother): Hip hop, R&B 
Janelle Monae: Funk, R&B 
Tamela Mann: Gospel
Mulatto: Hip hop
Matt "Guitar" Murphy: Blues
Mýa: R&B (African American father, Italian mother)
Monica: R&B
Mario: R&B
Lil' Mo: R&B, hip hop
Method Man: Hip hop
Post Malone: Hip hop
Maliibu Miitch: Hip hop (African American, Vietnamese and Filipino)
Mims: Hip hop
Maino: Hip hop
Money Man: Hip hop

N
Tech N9ne: Hip hop
Nas: Hip hop
Rico Nasty: Hip hop 
Nathan Morris: Vocal, singer
Nelly: Hip hop
Meshell Ndegeocello: Funk, soul, jazz 
Oliver Nelson: Jazz
Art Neville: Funk, R&B, soul
Aaron Neville: R&B, soul 
Cyril Neville: R&B, funk, blues
Charles Neville: R&B, jazz, funk, pop
David "Fathead" Newman: Jazz
Ne-Yo: R&B
Jessye Norman: Opera 
Brandy Norwood: R&B
Queen Naija (African-American mother): 
Normani: R&B
Noname Gypsy: Hip hop

O
Frank Ocean: LGBT R&B
Jeffrey Osborne: Soul, R&B
Odetta: Blues, jazz
Offset: Hip hop
Omarion: R&B
OJ da Juiceman: Hip hop
OMB Peezy: Hip hop

P
Pastor Troy: Hip hop
Keke Palmer: R&B, hip hop, pop
Charlie Parker: Jazz
Ray Parker Jr.: R&B, pop
Billy Paul: Soul, R&B, jazz
Scherrie Payne: R&B, pop, disco
Teddy Pendergrass: R&B, soul, disco
Phemza The Kween: Christian hip hop, hyphy, bounce, trap, R&B, Hip hop soul, gospel
Wilson Pickett: R&B, soul
Playboi Carti: Hip hop
Plies: Hip hop
Billy Preston: R&B, soul, funk 
Prince: Pop, rock, R&B, soul 
Leontyne Price: Opera 
Kelly Price: R&B, soul 
Charley Pride: Country, gospel
Pharrell: Hip hop, R&B, funk
Billy Porter: Pop
Petey Pablo: Hip hop

Q
Rich Homie Quan: Hip hop
Quavo: Hip hop
DJ Quik: Hip hop
Quando Rondo: Hip hop

R
Raz-B: R&B
Sun Ra: Jazz
Lou Rawls: Gospel, R&B, soul, jazz, blues
Ma Rainey: Blues
Jimmy Reed: Blues
Louisiana Red: Blues
Trippie Redd: Hip hop 
Otis Redding: Soul, R&B, blues 
Lil Reese: Hip hop, drill
Della Reese: Jazz, pop
Dianne Reeves: Jazz 
Martha Reeves: R&B, pop 
Roddy Ricch: Hip hop
Lionel Richie: Soul, R&B, pop
Little Richard: Rock and roll, R&B, gospel, soul
Pretty Ricky: R&B
Teddy Riley: R&B, hip hop
Flo Rida: Hip hop, pop
Minnie Riperton: soul, R&B 
Max Roach: Jazz
Black Rob: Hip hop
Paul Robeson: Pop 
Bill Robinson: Jazz, pop 
Smokey Robinson: R&B, soul, pop 
Sylvia Robinson: R&B, soul, Hip hop
ASAP Rocky: Hip hop (half-African American, half-Barbadian)
Nile Rodgers: Disco, soul, R&B, rock, funk
Diana Ross: R&B, soul, disco, Jazz 
Rick Ross: Hip hop
Sonny Rollins: Jazz
Otis Rush: Blues, R&B 
Patrice Rushen: R&B 
David Ruffin: R&B, pop, soul, disco, gospel
Jimmy Ruffin: R&B, soul, pop
Chance the Rapper: Hip hop, R&B
Rapsody: Hip hop 
Kelly Rowland: R&B, soul, pop
Rocko: Hip hop, rap
Ja Rule: Hip hop
Rubi Rose: Hip hop
Raekwon: Hip hop
Renni Rucci: Hip hop

S
Pharoah Sanders: Jazz
Marvin Sapp: Gospel
Ruben Studdard: Singer
Saweetie: Hip hop (African American father, Chinese and Filipino mother)
Shawn Stockman : R&B
Young Scooter: Hip hop
Jimmy Scott: Jazz 
Tupac Shakur: Hip hop, revolutionary, poet, freedom fighter
Kierra Sheard: Gospel
Pooh Shiesty: Hip hop, Southern hip hop, Memphis rap
Bobby Shmurda: Hip hop, Brooklyn drill
Wayne Shorter: Jazz
Nina Simone: R&B, jazz, blues, folk, soul, gospel
Sisqó: R&B
Marvin Sapp: Gospel
Bessie Smith: Blues 
Jimmy Smith: Jazz
Big Sean: Hip hop, Midwest hip hop 
Magic Sam: Blues
Magic Slim: Blues
Memphis Slim: Blues
Horace Silver: Jazz
Percy Sledge: R&B, soul, gospel
Pop Smoke: Hip hop, East Coast hip hop, Brooklyn Drill
Jordin Sparks: R&B, pop
Ice Spice: Hip hop, Bronx drill
Mavis Staples: Soul, R&B 
Megan Thee Stallion: Rap, Hip hop, R&B, Southern hip hop
Sly Stone: Funk, R&B 
Donna Summer: Disco, R&B 
Pink Sweats: Pop
Musiq Soulchild: R&B, soul, neo soul 
Raphael Saadiq: R&B, soul 
Trey Songz: R&B, hip hop 
Marlena Shaw: Soul, disco
Bobby Short: Jazz
Billy Strayhorn: Jazz 
Travis Scott: Hip hop, trap, R&B, Southern hip hop
Rae Sremmurd: Hip hop, trap, R&B 
Kierra Sheard: Urban gospel, R&B 
Karen Clark Sheard: Gospel, urban gospel 
Keith Sweat: R&B, soul, hip hop, urban
Southside: Hip hop
Musiq Soulchild: R&B
Saucy Santana: Hip hop
SZA: Pop, R&B, Soul
Day Sulan: Hip hop
Beanie Sigel: Hip hop
Swoope: Christian hip hop, Urban contemporary gospel
Shawty Lo: Hip hop
Shy Glizzy: Hip hop
Silentó: Hip hop
SPOTEMGOTTEM: Hip hop
Mariah the Scientist: R&B

T
Tinashe: R&B, hip hop, pop
TLC: R&B, Pop
Rozonda Thomas: R&B
Pusha T: Hip hop
Tank: Hip hop
Art Tatum: Jazz
Billy Taylor: Jazz
Cecil Taylor: Jazz
Koko Taylor: Blues, soul
Clark Terry: Jazz
Jean Terrell: R&B, soul, jazz
Tammi Terrell: R&B, soul
Bryson Tiller: R&B, hip hop
Young Thug: Hip hop
T.I.: Hip hop
T-Pain: Hip hop, R&B
Big Joe Turner: Blues, R&B
Ike Turner: R&B, soul, blues, rock and roll
Tina Turner: R&B, pop, soul, rock and roll
Stanley Turrentine: Jazz
Tyler, the Creator: Hip-hop
McCoy Tyner: Jazz
Tye Tribbett: Gospel
Twista: Hip hop
Timbaland: Hip hop, R&B, dance
Tyga: Hip hop
Tedashii: Christian hip hop
Thi'sl: Christian hip hop

U
Usher: R&B, pop
Unk: Hip hop

V
Luther Vandross: R&B, soul, pop, disco
Sarah Vaughan: Jazz, pop
Cassie Ventura: R&B
Bobby V: R&B
King Von: Hip hop, drill, gangsta rap
V.I.C.: Hip hop

W
Wale: Hip hop
Ethel Waters: Jazz, gospel, blues
Muddy Waters: Blues
Hezekiah Walker, Gospel
Little Walter: Blues, R&B
Dionne Warwick: R&B, soul, pop, gospel
Dinah Washington: Jazz, blues, R&B
Geno Washington: Soul, R&B, pop, blues
Grover Washington Jr.: Jazz, soul, R&B
Keenan Webb, also known as DJ Suede the Remix God: Trap, Hip hop
Barry White: R&B, soul, funk, disco
Maurice White: Soul, funk, R&B, jazz
CeCe Winans: Gospel, R&B 
Andre Williams: R&B, blues
Michelle Williams: R&B, gospel, pop, soul
Otis Williams: R&B, soul, disco
Paul Williams: R&B, soul
Pharrell Williams: Hip hop, R&B, funk, pop
Tony Williams: Jazz
Eddie Willis: Soul, R&B
Wesley Willis: Punk rock
Charlie Wilson: R&B, hip hop, soul, funk
Gerald Wilson: Jazz, pop
Mary Wilson: R&B, soul, pop, funk
Nancy Wilson: R&B, pop, jazz, soul, blues
Sonny Boy Williamson I: Blues
Sonny Boy Williamson II: Blues
Bill Withers: Soul, R&B, blues, funk
Tionne Watkins: R&B
Johnny "Guitar" Watson: Blues, soul, funk
Carl Weathersby: Blues
Junior Wells: Blues
Mary Wells: R&B, pop, soul
Kanye West: Hip hop, R&B
Lil Wayne: Hip hop, Southern hip hop
Ali-Ollie Woodson: R&B, pop, soul
Stevie Wonder: Soul, pop, R&B, funk
Bobby Womack: R&B, gospel, soul, R&R, funk, rock, jazz
Howlin' Wolf: Blues
Bow Wow: Hip hop
Juice WRLD: Hip hop, R&B, trap
Webbie: Hip hop
Fetty Wap: Hip hop

X
XXXTentacion : Hip hop, SoundCloud rap, lo-fi
Xzibit: Hip hop

Y
Ne-Yo: R&B
Yo Gotti: Hip hop 
Lester Young: Jazz
Yung Joc: Hip hop
Young Dro: Hip hop
Young Buck: Hip hop

Z
Jay-Z: Hip hop

Science and mathematics
 List of African-American astronauts
 List of African-American inventors and scientists
 List of African-American mathematicians
 List of African American women in STEM fields

Sports

Baseball

A
Hank Aaron, retired professional baseball player, member of National Baseball Hall of Fame
Tommie Aaron
Tommie Agee 
Willie Aikens 
Gary Alexander 
Matt Alexander 
Ted Alexander 
Dick Allen 
Greg Allen 
Garvin Alston 
George Altman 
Garret Anderson 
Marlon Anderson 
Chris Archer

B
Harold Baines 
Dusty Baker 
Gene Baker 
James Baldwin 
Dan Bankhead 
Sam Bankhead
Ernie Banks 
Willie Banks
Jesse Barfield
Kevin Bass 
Earl Battey 
Don Baylor 
Tony Beasley 
Tim Beckham 
Albert Belle 
Mookie Betts 
Junius Bibbs
Jim Bibby 
Joe Black 
Paul Blair 
Vida Blue 
Barry Bonds
Bobby Bonds 
Lyman Bostock
Daryl Boston 
Michael Bourn
Mickey Bowers 
Jackie Bradley Jr. 
Phil Bradley 
Glenn Braggs
Michael Brantley 
Chet Brewer 
Marshall Bridges 
Lou Brock 
Hubie Brooks 
Domonic Brown
Jarvis Brown
Gates Brown
Willard Brown 
Don Buford
Al Bumbry
Homer Bush
Byron Buxton

C
Lorenzo Cain
Mike Cameron
Roy Campanella
Chris Carter
Joe Carter
Nate Colbert
Vince Coleman
Cecil Cooper
Al Cowens
Carl Crawford
Willie Crawford

D
Eric Davis
Khris Davis
Mo'ne Davis
Rajai Davis
Tommy Davis
Willie Davis
Andre Dawson
Ian Desmond 
Mike Devereaux 
Chris Dickerson 
Larry Doby
Al Downing 
Dan Driessen 
Elijah Dukes 
Taylor Duncan 
Shawon Dunston
Ray Durham
Leon Durham 
Jermaine Dye
Jarrod Dyson

E

Don Eaddy 
Mike Easler
Carl Edwards Jr.
Dock Ellis 
Carl Everett 
Leon Everitt

F
Eric Farris
Mike Felder
Cecil Fielder 
Prince Fielder 
Chone Figgins
Curt Flood
Cliff Floyd
George Foster 
Rube Foster
Dexter Fowler

G
Ron Gant
Ralph Garr
Amir Garrett
Cito Gaston
Bob Gibson
Jim Gilliam
Doug Glanville
Dwight Gooden
Brian Goodwin
Danny Goodwin
Tom Goodwin
Dee Gordon—professional baseball player
Tom Gordon—former professional baseball player
Curtis Granderson—professional baseball player
Mudcat Grant
Pumpsie Green
Ken Griffey Jr.—retired professional baseball player, Member of the National Baseball Hall of Fame
Ken Griffey Sr.
Marquis Grissom
Chris Gwynn
Tony Gwynn—retired professional baseball player, Member of the National Baseball Hall of Fame
Tony Gwynn Jr.

H
Billy Hamilton—professional baseball player
Jeffrey Hammonds
Mike Harkey—retired professional baseball player
Tommy Harper—former professional baseball player
Lenny Harris
Willie Harris 
Wilmer Harris 
Josh Harrison—professional baseball player
Billy Hatcher
LaTroy Hawkins—retired professional baseball player
Charlie Hayes—former professional baseball player 
Dave Henderson—former professional baseball player
Rickey Henderson—retired professional baseball player, Member of National Baseball Hall of Fame 
Steve Henderson—former professional baseball player
George Hendrick—former professional baseball player
Elrod Hendricks—former professional baseball player
Larry Herndon—former professional baseball player
Jason Heyward—professional baseball player
Aaron Hicks—professional baseball player
Glenallen Hill—former professional baseball player
Larry Hisle—former professional baseball player
L.J. Hoes—professional baseball player
Elston Howard—retired professional baseball player
Ryan Howard—professional baseball player
Orlando Hudson—former professional baseball player
Torii Hunter—retired professional baseball player

I
Monte Irvin—retired professional baseball player, Member of the National Baseball Hall of Fame

J
Austin Jackson—professional baseball player 
Aaron Judge—professional baseball player
Bo Jackson—former professional baseball player
Edwin Jackson—professional baseball player
Grant Jackson—former professional baseball player
Jeremy Jeffress—professional baseball player
Desmond Jennings—professional baseball player
Derek Jeter (African-American father)—retired professional baseball player
Sam Jethroe—former professional baseball player
Alex Johnson—retired professional baseball player
Charles Johnson—former professional baseball player 
Cliff Johnson—former professional baseball player 
Sam Jethroe—former professional baseball player
Alex Johnson—former professional baseball player 
Charles Johnson—former professional baseball player
Cliff Johnson—former professional baseball player
Micah Johnson—professional baseball player
Adam Jones—professional baseball player
Cleon Jones—former professional baseball player
Gary Jones—professional baseball manager
Ruppert Jones—retired professional baseball player
Sam Jones—former professional baseball player
David Justice—retired professional baseball player

K
Matt Kemp—professional baseball player
Howie Kendrick—professional baseball player
Wayne Kirby—retired professional baseball player

L
Buck Leonard, former professional baseball player

P
 Satchel Paige, former professional baseball player

R
Jackie Robinson, former professional baseball player, member of the National Baseball Hall of Fame, first African American to play in Major league Baseball
Frank Robinson, former professional baseball player

S
CC Sabathia, professional baseball player
Giancarlo Stanton, professional baseball player 
Gary Sheffield, retired professional baseball player
Justus Sheffield, professional baseball player

M
Lee May – former professional baseball player
Andrew McCutchen – professional baseball player
Willie McCovey – former professional baseball player
Joe Morgan – retired professional baseball player

N
Don Newcombe – former professional baseball player

W
Dave Winfield – retired professional baseball player
Jerome Williams – baseball player

Basketball

A
Kareem Abdul-Jabbar - former professional basketball player, member of the Naismith Memorial Basketball Hall of Fame 
Quincy Acy - professional basketball player
Jordan Adams - professional basketball player
Arron Afflalo - professional basketball player
Arthur Agee - retired professional basketball player
Maurice Ager - former professional basketball player
Mark Aguirre - retired professional basketball player
LaMarcus Aldridge - professional basketball player
Cliff Alexander - professional basketball player
Kwame Alexander - professional basketball player
Jarrett Allen - professional basketball player
Jerome Allen - former professional basketball player
Lavoy Allen - professional basketball player
Ray Allen - retired professional basketball player
Tony Allen - professional basketball player
Alan Anderson - professional basketball player
James Anderson - professional basketball player
Justin Anderson - professional basketball player
Kenny Anderson - former professional basketball player
Nick Anderson - retired professional basketball player
Carmelo Anthony - professional basketball player, (African-American mother)
Greg Anthony - retired professional basketball player
Cole Anthony - basketball player (African American father)
Nate Archibald - former professional basketball player
Jim Ard - former professional basketball player
Gilbert Arenas - retired professional basketball player
B.J. Armstrong - former professional basketball player
Darrell Arthur - professional basketball player
Al Attles - former professional basketball player
D.J. Augustin - professional basketball player
Jeff Ayres - professional basketball player
 Ron Artest III

B
Thurl Bailey—former professional basketball player
Wade Baldwin IV—professional basketball player
Lonzo Ball (African-American father)—professional basketball player
LiAngelo Ball (African-American father)—professional basketball player
LaMelo Ball (African-American father)—professional basketball player
Gene Banks—retired professional basketball player
Tony Barbee—former professional basketball player
Charles Barkley—retired professional basketball player, member of the Naismith Memorial Basketball Hall of Fame 
Don Barksdale—former professional basketball player
Harrison Barnes—professional basketball player
Matt Barnes (African American father)—retired professional basketball player
Earl Barron—professional basketball player
Will Barton—professional basketball player
Brandon Bass—professional basketball player
Shane Battier—retired professional basketball player
Elgin Baylor—former professional basketball player
Kent Bazemore—professional basketball player
Bradley Beal—professional basketball player
Butch Beard—former professional basketball player
Malik Beasley—professional basketball player
Michael Beasley—professional basketball player 
Chris Bosh—professional basketball player
Marvin Bagley—professional basketball player 
Mikal Bridges—professional basketball player
Miles Bridges—professional basketball player
Bruce Brown Jr.—professional basketball player
Troy Brown Jr.—professional basketball player
Jalen Brunson—professional basketball player
Dwayne Bacon—professional basketball player
Jordan Bell—professional basketball player
Jaylen Brown—professional basketball player
Antonio Blakeney—professional basketball player
James Blackmon Jr.—professional basketball player
Thomas Bryant—professional basketball player
Isaiah Briscoe—professional basketball player
Tony Bradley—professional basketball player
Sterling Brown—professional basketball player
Jabari Bird—professional basketball player
Malcolm Brogdon—professional basketball player
Jerryd Bayless—professional basketball player
Jimmy Butler—professional basketball player
Rasual Butler—former professional basketball player
Aaron Brooks—professional basketball player 
Will Barton—professional basketball player
MarShon Brooks—professional basketball player
Walt Bellamy—former professional basketball player
Kobe Bryant—retired professional basketball player
Kwame Brown—professional basketball player
Trey Burke—professional basketball player 
Reggie Bullock—professional basketball player
Chauncey Billups—retired professional basketball player 
Muggsy Bogues—retired professional basketball player
Terrell Brandon—retired professional basketball player 
Eric Bledsoe—professional basketball player
Patrick Beverley—professional basketball player
Avery Bradley—professional basketball player

C
Dell Curry - former professional basketball player 
Stephen Curry - professional basketball player
Seth Curry - professional basketball player 
Wilt Chamberlain - retired professional basketball player, Member of Naismith Memorial Basketball Hall of Fame, only NBA player to score 100 points
Wendell Carter Jr. - professional basketball player
DeMarcus Cousins - professional basketball player
Ian Clark - professional basketball player
Norris Cole - professional basketball player
Quinn Cook - professional basketball player
Jevon Carter - professional basketball player
Vince Carter - professional basketball player
Jordan Clarkson (African-American father) - professional basketball player
Tony Carr - professional basketball player
Bryant Crawford - professional basketball player
Jamal Crawford - professional basketball player
John Collins - professional basketball player
Marquese Chriss - professional basketball player
Tyson Chandler - professional basketball player
Isaiah Canaan - professional basketball player
Mario Chalmers - professional basketball player
Jordan Crawford - professional basketball player
Jarrett Culver - professional basketball player

D
Anthony Davis - professional basketball player 
Antonio Davis - former professional basketball player
Ed Davis - professional basketball player
Glen Davis - former professional basketball player 
Adrian Dantley - retired professional basketball player 
 Andre Drummond- Professional basketball Player
Baron Davis - retired professional basketball player
Deyonta Davis - professional basketball player 
Dewayne Dedmon - professional basketball player
DeMar DeRozan - professional basketball player
Erick Dampier - former professional basketball player
Clyde Drexler - retired professional basketball player
Kevin Durant - professional basketball player
Kris Dunn - professional basketball player 
P.J. Dozier - professional basketball player 
Troy Daniels - professional basketball player
Trevon Duval - professional basketball player

E

Jawun Evans - professional basketball player
Tyreke Evans - professional basketball player
Reggie Evans - retired professional basketball player 
Julius Erving - retired professional basketball player, member of the Naismith Memorial Basketball Hall of Fame

F
De'Aaron Fox - professional basketball player
Kay Felder - professional basketball player
Markelle Fultz - professional basketball player 
Terrance Ferguson - professional basketball player
Yogi Ferrell - professional basketball player

G
Horace Grant - retired professional basketball player
Draymond Green - professional basketball player 
Hal Greer - retired professional basketball player
George Gervin - retired professional basketball player, member of the Naismith Memorial Basketball Hall of Fame
Harry Giles - professional basketball player
Kevin Garnett - retired professional basketball player 
Paul George - professional basketball player 
Michael Kidd-Gilchrist - professional basketball player
 Ben Gordon (Africans-Americans mother) - Basketball player

H
Elvin Hayes - retired professional basketball player
Anfernee "Penny" Hardaway - retired professional basketball player
Happy Hairston - former professional basketball player
PJ Hairston - professional basketball player
Dwight Howard - professional basketball player 
Grant Hill - retired professional basketball player, member of Naismith Memorial Basketball Hall of Fame
James Harden - professional basketball player 
Josh Hart - professional basketball player
Tobias Harris - professional basketball player 
Ron Harper - retired professional basketball player
Rodney Hood - professional basketball player
Udonis Haslem - professional basketball player
John Henson - professional basketball player
Montrezl Harrell - professional basketball player
Jrue Holiday - professional basketball player
Justin Holiday - professional basketball player
Aaron Holiday - professional basketball player
De'Andre Hunter - professional basketball player
Larry Hughes - retired professional basketball player
Richard Hamilton - retired professional basketball player
 Solomon Hill

I
Allen Iverson - retired professional basketball player, member of the Naismith Memorial Basketball Hall of Fame
Brandon Ingram - professional basketball player 
Kyrie Irving - professional basketball player

J
DeAndre Jordan - professional basketball player 
Derrick Jones Jr. - professional basketball player
Josh Jackson - professional basketball player
Frank Jackson (African American father) - professional basketball player 
K.C. Jones - retired professional basketball player
Sam Jones - retired professional basketball player
Tyus Jones (African-American father)  - professional basketball player 
Jaren Jackson - retired professional basketball player
Jaren Jackson Jr. - professional basketball player
LeBron James - professional basketball player
Dennis Johnson - former professional basketball player
Magic Johnson - retired professional basketball player, member of Naismith Memorial Basketball Hall of Fame
Michael Jordan - retired professional basketball player, member of Naismith Memorial Basketball Hall of Fame, considered as the greatest player in NBA History. 
Amile Jefferson - professional basketball player
Jarrett Jack - professional basketball player
Reggie Jackson

K
Brandon Knight - professional basketball player
Kevin Knox - professional basketball player
Jason Kidd - retired professional basketball player (African American Father)
Kemba Walker - professional basketball player (African American Mother)

L
Bob Lanier - retired professional basketball player
Damian Lillard - professional basketball player
Kawhi Leonard - professional basketball player 
Kyle Lowry - professional basketball player 
Rashard Lewis - retired professional basketball player
Caris LeVert - professional basketball player

M
Bob McAdoo - retired professional basketball player and coach
CJ McCollum - professional basketball player 
Alonzo Mourning - retired professional basketball player, member of the Naismith Memorial Basketball Hall of Fame
Donovan Mitchell - professional basketball player 
Ja Morant - professional basketball player
Karl Malone - retired professional basketball player, member of the Naismith Memorial Basketball Hall of Fame
Moses Malone - former professional basketball player, member of Naismith Memorial Basketball Hall of Fame
Cedric Maxwell - retired professional basketball player
Malik Monk - professional basketball player
Reggie Miller - retired professional basketball player, member of the Naismith Memorial Basketball Hall of Fame
Tracy McGrady - retired professional basketball player, member of the Naismith Memorial Basketball Hall of Fame 
Earl Monroe - retired professional basketball player
Marcus Morris - professional basketball player
Markieff Morris - professional basketball player 
Khris Middleton - professional basketball player 
Wesley Matthews - professional basketball player

N
 Aaron Nesmith
 Georges Niang
Malik Newman - professional basketball player

O
Charles Oakley - former professional basketball player
Jahlil Okafor - professional basketball player
 Kelly Oubre Jr.
Shaquille O'Neal - retired professional basketball player, member of Naismith Memorial Basketball Hall of Fame

P
Robert Parish - retired professional basketball player
Chris Paul - professional basketball player 
Gary Payton - retired professional basketball player, member of the Naismith Memorial Basketball Hall of Fame
Jabari Parker (African-American father) - professional basketball player 
Kendrick Perkins - former professional basketball player 
Sam Perkins - former professional basketball player
Paul Pierce - retired professional basketball player
Scottie Pippen - former professional basketball player, member of the Naismith Memorial Basketball Hall of Fame
 Scotty Pippen Jr.- (African-American father) - professional basketball player
 Jordan Poole

R
Bill Russell - former professional basketball player, member of the Naismith Memorial Basketball Hall of Fame 
Cam Reddish - basketball player
Willis Reed - retired professional basketball player, coach and manager
Doc Rivers - retired professional basketball player, NBA head coach 
Austin Rivers (African American father) - professional basketball player
Derrick Rose - professional basketball player
D'Angelo Russell - professional basketball player 
Dennis Rodman - retired professional basketball player, member of Naismith Memorial Basketball Hall of Fame
Jalen Rose - retired professional basketball player 
Oscar Robertson - former professional basketball player, member of the Naismith Memorial Basketball Hall of Fame
Rajon Rondo - professional basketball player 
Terrence Ross - professional basketball player 
Terry Rozier - professional basketball player
Josh Richardson - professional basketball player
Clifford Robinson - former professional basketball player
David Robinson - former professional basketball player

S
John Salley - former professional basketball player
Satch Sanders - former professional basketball player
Anfernee Simons - professional basketball player
Caleb Swanigan - professional basketball player
Dennis Smith Jr. - professional basketball player
Dennis Scott - retired professional basketball player
Iman Shumpert - professional basketball player
Kenny Smith - retired professional basketball player 
John Salmons - retired professional basketball player
John Salley - retired professional basketball player
Collin Sexton - professional basketball player 
Marcus Smart - professional basketball player 
Omari Spellman - professional basketball player
JR Smith - professional basketball player
Lance Stephenson - professional basketball player
Eric Snow - former professional basketball player and coach
Jerry Stackhouse - retired professional basketball player

T
Gary Trent - former professional basketball player
Gary Trent Jr. - professional basketball player
Isiah Thomas - retired professional basketball player, member of the Naismith Memorial Basketball Hall of Fame
Isaiah Thomas - professional basketball player
David Thompson - retired professional basketball player
Jayson Tatum - professional basketball player 
Karl-Anthony Towns (African-American father) - professional basketball player
Jason Terry - professional basketball player
 Klay Thompson 
Myles Turner - professional basketball player
Wayman Tisdale - former professional basketball player
 Terry Taylor

U
Wes Unseld - retired professional basketball player

W
Chris Webber - retired professional basketball player 
Dwyane Wade - professional basketball player 
 Dominique Wilkins
 Earl Watson
 Gerald Wilkins
John Wall - professional basketball player
Russell Westbrook - professional basketball player
Justise Winslow - professional basketball player 
T. J. Warren - professional basketball player
Dion Waiters - professional basketball player 
Jamaal Wilkes - retired professional basketball player
Lenny Wilkens - retired professional basketball player
Zion Williamson - basketball player
Lou Williams - professional basketball player
Marvin Williams - professional basketball player
Hassan Whiteside - professional basketball player
Coby White - professional basketball player
James Worthy - retired professional basketball player
 Mitchell Wiggins

Y
Trae Young (African-American father)  - professional basketball player

Boxing

A
DeAndrey Abron, former professional boxer 
Devon Alexander, professional boxer 
Laila Ali, former professional boxer
Muhammad Ali, former professional boxer, activist, philanthropist, recognized as the greatest athlete of all time
Rahman Ali, former professional boxer
Demetrius Andrade, professional boxer 
Henry Armstrong, professional boxer
Emanuel Augustus, former professional boxer

B
Johnathon Banks, former professional boxer 
Johnny Banks, former professional boxer 
Kelcie Banks, former professional boxer 
Sonny Banks, former professional boxer 
Riddick Bowe, former professional boxer
Timothy Bradley, former professional boxer 
Maurice Brantley, former professional boxer 
Lamon Brewster, former professional boxer
Shannon Briggs, professional boxer
Adrien Broner, professional boxer
Joe Brown, former professional boxer
Trevor Bryan, former professional boxer 
Chris Byrd, former professional boxer

C
Jermall Charlo, professional boxer 
Jermell Charlo, professional boxer 
Terence Crawford, professional boxer
Steve Cunningham, former professional boxer

D
Gervonta Davis, professional boxer 
Howard Davis Jr., former professional boxer
Anthony Dirrell, professional boxer 
Michael Dokes, former professional boxer
Larry Donald, former professional boxer 
Joseph Dorsey Jr., former professional boxer 
Buster Douglas, former professional boxer

E
Jimmy Ellis, professional boxer
Jaron Ennis, professional boxer

F
George Foreman, former professional boxer
Joe Frazier, former professional boxer
Stephen Fulton, professional boxer

G
Derrick Gainer, former professional boxer
George Godfrey, former professional boxer
Joshua Greer Jr., former professional boxer

H
Marvelous Marvin Hagler, former professional boxer
Devin Haney, professional boxer 
Tony Harrison, professional boxer 
Thomas Hearns, former professional boxer 
Jamel Herring, professional boxer 
Larry Holmes, former professional boxer 
Evander Holyfield, former professional boxer
Maurice Hooker, professional boxer
Bernard Hopkins, former professional boxer
Jarrett Hurd, former professional boxer

I
Amir Imam, professional boxer

J
Beau Jack, former lightweight boxer
Daniel Jacobs, professional boxer 
Jack Johnson, former professional boxer
Roy Jones Jr., former professional boxer
Zab Judah, professional boxer

K
James Kinchen, former professional boxer

L
Sugar Ray Leonard, former professional boxer
John Henry Lewis, former professional boxer
Sonny Liston, professional boxer
Rocky Lockridge, former professional boxer
Joe Louis, former professional boxer 
Ron Lyle, professional boxer

M
Floyd Mayweather Sr., former professional boxer
Floyd Mayweather Jr., former professional boxer
Roger Mayweather, former professional boxer
Oliver McCall, professional boxer
Ray Mercer, former professional boxer
Bob Montgomery, former lightweight boxer
Archie Moore, professional boxer
Shane Mosley, former professional boxer

N
Ken Norton, former professional boxer

P
Floyd Patterson, former professional boxer
Shawn Porter, professional boxer 
Aaron Pryor, professional boxer

Q
Dwight Muhammad Qawi, former professional boxer

R
Hasim Rahman, former professional boxer
Sugar Ray Robinson, professional boxer
Gary Russell Jr., professional boxer

S
Ed Sanders, former professional boxer
Earnie Shavers, former professional boxer
Errol Spence Jr., professional boxer
Cory Spinks, former professional boxer
Leon Spinks, former professional boxer
Michael Spinks, former professional boxer
Shakur Stevenson, professional boxer

T
Jermain Taylor, former professional boxer 
Keith Thurman, professional boxer 
James Toney, former professional boxer
Austin Trout, professional boxer 
Caleb Truax, professional boxer
Tony Tucker, former professional boxer 
Mike Tyson, former professional boxer

W
Andre Ward, former professional boxer 
Pernell Whitaker, professional boxer
Deontay Wilder, professional boxer
Tim Witherspoon, former professional boxer
Chalky Wright, former professional boxer
Winky Wright, former professional boxer

Fencing
Ruth White, retired fencer

Football

B
Antonio Brown, professional football player 
Jim Brown, retired professional football player, member of the Pro Football Hall of Fame
Dez Bryant, professional football player
Odell Beckham Jr., professional football player 
Le'Veon Bell, professional football player
Cedric Benson, professional football player
 Sergio Brown

C
 Saahdiq Charles
 Yodny Cajuste

E
 Akayleb Evans
Ezekiel Elliott - professional football player

G
Rosey Grier - retired professional football player
Mel Groomes - former professional football player

H
Dwayne Haskins - professional football player

I
Michael Irvin - former professional football player, member of the Pro Football Hall of Fame

J
Edwin Jackson - former professional football player
Jerry Jeudy - professional football player 
Lamar Jackson - professional football player
Willie Jeffries - former player and head football coach of South Carolina State University, member of the College Football Hall of Fame
Deacon Jones - former professional football player

K
Colin Kaepernick (African-American father) - professional football player

L
Ray Lewis - retired professional football player, member of Pro Football Hall of Fame
Floyd Little - professional football player
Marshawn Lynch - retired football player

M
Bob Mann - former professional football player 
Khalil Mack - professional football player
Kyler Murray - professional football player 
Patrick Mahomes - professional football player
Marion Motley - former professional football player, member of the Pro Football Hall of Fame 
Randy Moss - retired professional football player, member of the Pro Football Hall of Fame

N
Cam Newton - professional football player

O
 Dayo Odeyingbo
Terrell Owens - retired professional football player, member of the Pro Football Hall of Fame

P
Dak Prescott - professional football player
Walter Payton - former professional football player, member of Pro Football Hall of Fame
Joe Perry - former professional football player, member of the Pro Football Hall of Fame
 Micah Parsons
Fritz Pollard - former professional football player, member of the Pro Football Hall of Fame

S
Barry Sanders - former professional football player, member of the Pro Football Hall of Fame
Deion Sanders - former professional football & baseball player, member of the Pro Football Hall of Fame
Gale Sayers - former professional football player
Marcus Spears - former professional football player
Warren Sapp - retired professional football player
O. J. Simpson - former professional football player
Bubba Smith - former professional football player
Woody Strode - former professional football player
Terrell Suggs - professional football player

T
George Taliaferro - former professional football player

V
Michael Vick - retired professional football player

W
Damien Woody - retired professional football player
Jameis Winston - professional football player
Russell Wilson - professional football player
Bill Willis - former professional football player, member of the Pro Football Hall of Fame
Hines Ward (African American father) - retired professional football player 
Deshaun Watson - professional football player
Herschel Walker - retired professional football player
Kenny Washington - former professional football player
Fred Williamson - retired professional football player
Carl Weathers - retired professional football player

Golf

Jerry Bruner, professional golfer
Althea Gibson, former professional golfer
Calvin Peete, former professional golfer
Renee Powell, professional golfer
Charlie Sifford, professional golfer
Bill Spiller, former professional golfer
Jim Thorpe, professional golfer
Tiger Woods (African American father), professional golfer, winner of 14 major championships
Harold Varner III, professional golfer

Gymnastics
Simone Biles, gymnast
Dominique Dawes
Gabby Douglas
Kyla Ross
Tasha Schwikert

Hockey

Justin Bailey
Blake Bolden
Francis Bouillon
Donald Brashear
J. T. Brown
Dustin Byfuglien
Gerald Coleman
Robbie Earl
Emerson Etem
Jordan Greenway
Mike Grier
Val James
Justin Johnson
Caleb Jones
Seth Jones
Greg Mauldin
K'Andre Miller
Nyjer Morgan
Justin Morrison
Kyle Okposo
Jordan Samuels-Thomas
C. J. Suess
Scooter Vaughan
Shawn Wheeler
Charles Williams

Swimming
Cullen Jones
Simone Manuel
Lia Neal
David Curtiss
Sybil Smith

Tennis

A
Arthur Ashe - retired professional tennis player

B
James Blake - professional tennis player

G
Zina Garrison - retired professional tennis player
Althea Gibson - retired professional tennis player 
Coco Gauff - professional tennis player

J
Jarmere Jenkins - retired professional tennis player

K
Madison Keys - professional tennis player

M
Nicholas Monroe - professional tennis player

R
Chanda Rubin - professional tennis player

S
Bryan Shelton - retired professional tennis player

T
Taylor Townsend - professional tennis player

S
Sloane Stephens - professional tennis player

W
Mashona Washington - retired professional tennis player
Richard Williams - professional tennis coach
Serena Williams - professional tennis player
Venus Williams - professional tennis player

Y
Donald Young - professional tennis player

Track and field

A
Charles Austin, retired track and field athlete

B
Ronnie Baker, professional track and field athlete
Bob Beamon, retired track and field athlete
Larry Black, former track and field athlete
Trayvon Bromell, professional track and field athlete
Ralph Boston, former track and field athlete
Leroy Burrell, retired track and field athlete

C
Milt Campbell, former track and field athlete
Henry Carr, former track and field athlete
Andre Cason, retired track and field athlete
Jearl Miles Clark, retired track and field athlete
Kerron Clement, professional track and field athlete
Alice Coachman, former track and field athlete
Wayne Collett, former track and field athlete
Christian Coleman, professional track and field athlete
Mike Conley Sr., retired track and field athlete
Shawn Crawford, retired track and field athlete
Josh Culbreath, retired track and field athlete

D
Tony Darden, retired track and field athlete
Otis Davis, retired track and field athlete
Walter Davis, professional track and field athlete
Harrison Dillard, retired track and field athlete
Jon Drummond, retired track and field athlete

E
Ashton Eaton, retired track and field athlete

F
Allyson Felix, professional track and field athlete
Phyllis Francis, professional track and field athlete
Ron Freeman, former track and field athlete

G
Justin Gatlin, professional track and field athlete
Tyson Gay, professional track and field athlete
Charles Green, professional track and field athlete
Maurice Greene, retired track and field athlete

H
Elijah Hall, professional track and field athlete
Danny Harris, retired track and field athlete
Otis Harris, professional track and field athlete
Alvin Harrison, retired track and field athlete
Jeff Henderson, professional track and field athlete
Jim Hines, retired track and field athlete

J
Larry James, former track and field athlete
Bershawn Jackson, professional track and field athlete
Cornelius Johnson, former track and field athlete
Michael Johnson, retired track and field athlete
Rafer Johnson, retired track and field athlete
Al Joyner, retired track and field athlete
Jackie Joyner-Kersee, retired track and field athlete
Florence Griffith Joyner, former track and field athlete

K
Roger Kingdom, retired track and field athlete
Erik Kynard, professional track and field athlete

L
Brian Lewis, professional track and field athlete
Carl Lewis, retired track and field athlete
Noah Lyles, professional track and field athlete

M
Michael Marsh, retired track and field athlete
Vincent Matthews, retired track and field athlete
Tony McQuay, professional track and field athlete
Aries Merritt, professional track and field athlete
LaShawn Merritt, professional track and field athlete
Ralph Metcalfe, former track and field athlete
Rod Milburn, former track and field athlete
Tim Montgomery, retired track and field athlete
Edwin Moses, retired track and field athlete

N
Dave Neville, retired track and field athlete

O
Dan O'Brien, retired track and field athlete
David Oliver, professional track and field athlete
Jesse Owens, former track and field athlete

P
Darvis Patton, retired track and field athlete
David Payne, professional track and field athlete
Mike Powell, retired track and field athlete
 Tiffany Porter

R
Mack Robinson, retired track and field athlete
Mike Rodgers, professional track and field athlete
Wilma Rudolph, former track and field athlete
Butch Reynolds, retired track and field athlete

S
Ronnie Ray Smith, former track and field athlete
Tommie Smith, retired track and field athlete
Wallace Spearmon, professional track and field athlete

T
Eddie Tolan, former track and field athlete
Gwen Torrence, retired track and field athlete
Wyomia Tyus, retired track and field athlete

W
Willye White, former track and field athlete
Archie Williams, former track and field athlete
John Woodruff, former track and field athlete

Y
Kevin Young, retired track and field athlete

Wrestling
Cedric Alexander, professional wrestler
Sasha Banks, professional wrestler 
Bianca Belair, professional wrestler
Shelton Benjamin, professional wrestler 
Angelo Dawkins, professional wrestler
Montez Ford, professional wrestler
Mark Henry, former professional wrestler 
Dwayne 'The Rock' Johnson, retired professional wrestler
Bobby Lashley, professional wrestler
Keith Lee, professional wrestler 
Moose, professional wrestler 
Willie Mack, professional wrestler
Montel Vontavious Porter, professional wrestler
R-Truth, professional wrestler 
Rich Swann, professional wrestler
King Booker, retired professional wrestler 
Naomi, professional wrestler
Titus O'Neil, professional wrestler
Xavier Woods, professional wrestler 
Mia Yim (African American father), professional wrestler

Motorsport
Bubba Wallace, NASCAR driver
Elias Bowie
Charlie Scott
George Wiltshire
Randy Bethea
 Willy T. Ribbs
Bill Lester

Martial arts
Daniel Cormier, mixed martial artist 
Jon Jones, mixed martial artist
Kevin Lee, mixed martial artist
Tyron Woodley, mixed martial artist

Soccer
 Andrew farrell
 Antonee Robinson
 Benji Michel
 Brandon Servania
 Bright Dike
 Charlie Davies
 Chris Richards
 DeAndre Yedlin
 DeJuan Jones
 DaMarcus Beasley
 Dante Sealy
 Duane Holmes
 Daryl Dike
 Eddie Gustafsson
 Eddie Johnson
Edson Buddle
 Erik Palmer-Brown
 Haji Wright
 Mark Segbers
 Tim Howard
 Tyler Adams
 Freddy Adu
 Kellyn Acosta
 Eddie Pope
 Briana Scurry
 Kofi Sarkodie
 Kayden Pierre
 Kurowskybob Pierre
 Jonathan David
 Jonathan Lewis
 Jozy Altidore
 Konrad de la Fuente
 Maurice Edu
 Mark Mckenzie
 Marlon Hairston
 Gyasi Zardes
 Julian Green
 Justin Che
 Marvell Wynne
 Sean Okoli
 Sean Johnson
 Tayvon Gray
 Weston McKennie
 Zack Steffen
 Patrick Koffi

First Ladies of the United States
Michelle Obama (2009–2017), first African American First Lady and the 44th First Lady

Anthologies of biographies
There is a substantial body of literature, much of it by African Americans, that collects biographies of black leaders. Notable examples in this genre are:
 100 Greatest African Americans
 The Afro-American Press and Its Editors
 Encyclopedia of the Harlem Renaissance
 Men of Mark: Eminent, Progressive and Rising
 Music and Some Highly Musical People
 Noted Negro Women: Their Triumphs and Activities

Other notables
 African Americans in Omaha, Nebraska, including a list of notable African Americans from Omaha
 List of African American actors 
 List of African-American astronauts
 List of first black Major League Baseball players
 List of black NHL players
 Black players in professional American football
 List of black quarterbacks
 Race and ethnicity in the NBA
 List of African-American singers
 List of African American pioneers in desegregation of higher education
 List of winners of the William E. Harmon foundation award for distinguished achievement among Negroes
 List of African American LGBT
 List of African-American writers
 List of African-American ballerinas
 List of African-American mathematicians
 List of African-American federal judges
 List of African-American jurists
 List of African-American inventors and scientists
 African-American architects, including a list of notable African American architects
 List of African-American pioneers in desegregation of higher education
 List of African-American visual artists
 List of unarmed African Americans killed by law enforcement officers in the United States

See also

369th Infantry Regiment (United States) 
 Lists of black people
 List of people by nationality
 Black Canadians 
List of Black Canadians 
 List of Jewish African-Americans 
African diaspora in the Americas 
List of African-American women in classical music
List of African-American women in STEM fields
List of African-American abolitionists
List of African-American speakers of U.S. state legislatures
List of African-American women in medicine
List of African-American mathematicians
List of African-American actors
List of LGBT African Americans
100 Greatest African Americans

References

External links
President Obama's Speech to the NAACP on July 16, 2009 - full video by MSNBC
Famous African Americans

Lists of American people by ethnic or national origin
Lists of people by ethnicity